= Baltic Finnic paganism =

Polytheistic religion practiced by the Finnic peoples

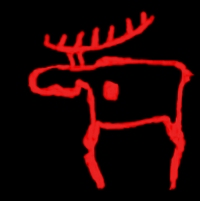
The elk is a common image in many Baltic Finnic petroglyphs. (Note: The animal called "elk" here (in Finnish, hirvi) is what North Americans call "moose" (Alces alces). European settlers in North America later applied the word "elk" to the species Cervus canadensis (also known by its Shawnee & Cree name wapiti) — a separate species.) (Note: Despite the image being featured on the cover of the article, it isn’t a real petroglyph, but a drawing inspired by it.)

Baltic Finnic paganism is the term for the ethnic religions of the various Baltic Finnic peoples, specifically the Finns, Estonians, Võros, Setos, Karelians, Veps, Izhorians, Votes and Livonians, prior to Christianisation. They were a polytheistic religions, worshipping a number of different deities. Ukko was the god of weather; other important deities included Jumala, Ahti, and Tapio. Jumala was a sky god; today, the word "Jumala" refers to a monotheistic God. Ahti was a god of the sea, waters and fish. Tapio was the god of the forest and hunting.

Baltic Finnic paganism included necrolatry (worship of the dead) and shamanism (tietäjä(t), literally "one who knows"), and the religion was not always uniform across the areas it was practiced, as customs and beliefs varied during different periods of time and regions. Baltic Finnic paganism shares some features with its neighbouring Baltic, Norse and Germanic pagan beliefs.

The organic tradition was sidelined due to Christianisation starting from ca. 12th century and finally broken by the early 20th century, when folk magic and oral traditions went extinct. Baltic Finnic paganism provided the inspiration for a contemporary pagan movement Suomenusko (Finnish: Belief of Finland), which is an attempt to reconstruct the old religion of the Finns. It is nevertheless based on secondary sources.

== Deities ==
Baltic Finnic pagans were polytheistic, believing in a number of different deities. Most of the deities ruled over a specific aspect of nature; for instance, Ukko was the god of the sky and thunder (ukkonen and ukonilma ["Ukko's air"] are still used in modern Finnish as terms for thunderstorms). These deities were often pan-Finnic, being worshipped by many different tribes in different regions. The Baltic Finnic pagans were also animists, worshipping local nature deities at site-specific shrines to that particular deity. These shrines are thought to be mainly "tree-gods": wooden statues or carvings done in trees or treestumps, depicting human figures, and have been scarcely preserved. One confirmed Stone Age wooden statue has been found in Pohjankuru, and folklore about worshipping tree-gods has been documented. Another kind of shrine are "cup-stones" (Finnish: kuppikivi), large natural stones into which cup-sized recesses have been drilled. Votive offerings of food or drink were left in these cups. Despite Christianization, offerings on these cup-stones continued up to the early 20th century.

=== Major deities ===
Several key deities were venerated by all the Baltic Finnic peoples and some other Finnic peoples, these pan-Finnic deities controlled many aspects of nature.

- Ukko was the ruler over the sky and weather. A corresponding figure is known in countless other cultures of the world.
- Another deity that appeared very significant to the Baltic Finnic pagans, but about whom modern scholars know very little, was Jumi, whose name is related to "Jumala", the modern Finnish language word for a monotheist God.
- There were many other important deities who ruled over a specific aspect of the natural world. Such as the deity of water was often called Ahti, and the deity of the forest was Tapio.
- Other major deities included Äkräs, a fertility goddess; Mielikki, the goddess of the forests and the hunt; and Kuutar, the goddess of the moon.
- Deities such as Väinämöinen and Ilmarinen were turned into great heroes in some later storytelling. Ilmarinen was previously a sky god, being replaced by Ukko.

==== Ukko ====
Ukko is the god of the sky, weather (mostly thunder, rain and clouds), a god of harvest and fertility. He is also given the epithet Ylijumala ('High God' (Note: The epithet Ylijumala ('High God'), can be interpreted in two ways; either that he really was the greatest, "highest," of the gods, or simply that he lived up in the sky.)) in at least the Finnish, Karelian and Ingrian regional variants of the pagan faith. He was associated with the sowing season during springtime according to Mikael Agricola. Ukko also had characteristics of a war god, and would be prayed to help in battle.

Ukko was sometimes given the epithet Isäinen ylinen Luoja ('Fatherly Supreme Creator'), and Salo notes that this could also be related to the sky-god *Dyēus of Proto-Indo-European religion.

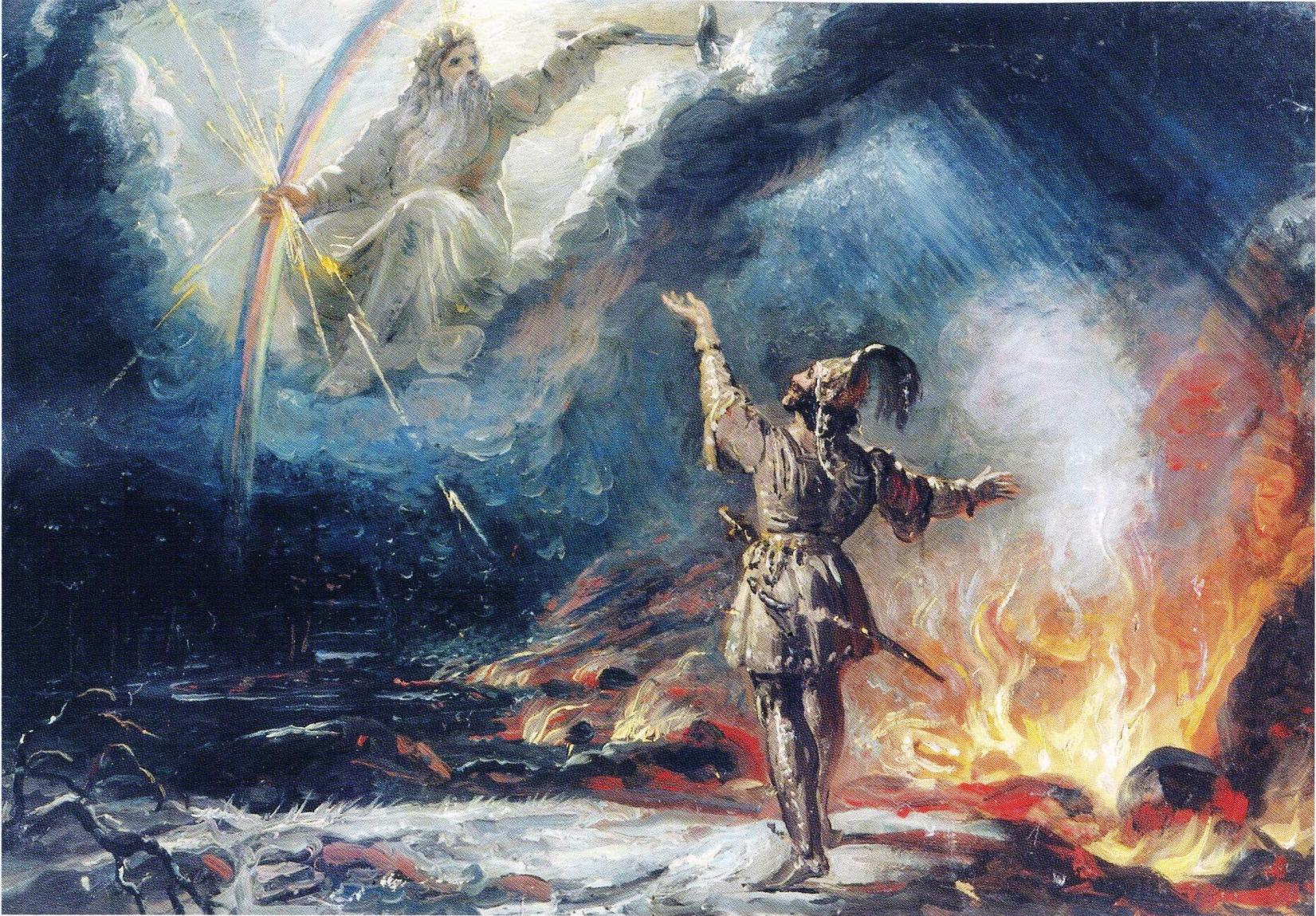
Ukko ylijumala (on the left) in RW Ekman's Kalevala painting Lemminkäinen on the fiery lake.

Ukko is perhaps to a significant extent derived from the various Baltic peoples. Ukko is thought to have entered Baltic Finnic paganism in the first millennium BC, replacing other chief deities who were more unique per region, such as Taara in Estonia. Before the influences of the Balts, the various Finnic people [most likely] had an earlier, original sky-god. Ilmarinen, who is known as the blacksmith in the Kalevala, is the earliest known to be sky-god of the various Uralic peoples. The Udmurt sky god Inmar corresponds to the Finnish Ilmarinen. Memories of Ilmarinen's status as the sky deity have been preserved in Kalevala myths, such as the belief that he forged the firmament and the Sampo.

==== Tapio ====
Tapio is a major deity in Baltic Finnic paganism (in its most recent form), he is the king and god of the forest and hunting. Tapio was prayed to for luck in hunting, because of his control over game. Tapio would often be sacrificed to, by sacrificing of animals, such as birds. Tapionpöytä ((Picea abies), literally 'Tapio's table') are spruce trees where sacrifices were made to Tapio. Tapio was extremely significant due to the tribal nature of the Baltic Finnic peoples during the time when Tapio was worshipped, as hunting and game was extremely important for survival, making Tapio one of the most important deities.

Tapio possessed over various spirits and was himself also a spirit, possessing Tapion väki ('Tapio's spirits/elves'), the spirit beings were central to the hunter's catch, and Tapio's spirits were thought to live in the deepest ravines of the forest and took care of plants and animals, in the darkness of the deep forest, which was called Tapiola. Tapiola was a kingdom which Tapio ruled over, and was sometimes used as the name for Finland by the Baltic Finnic pagan believers during the Early Middle Ages.

==== Ilmarinen ====
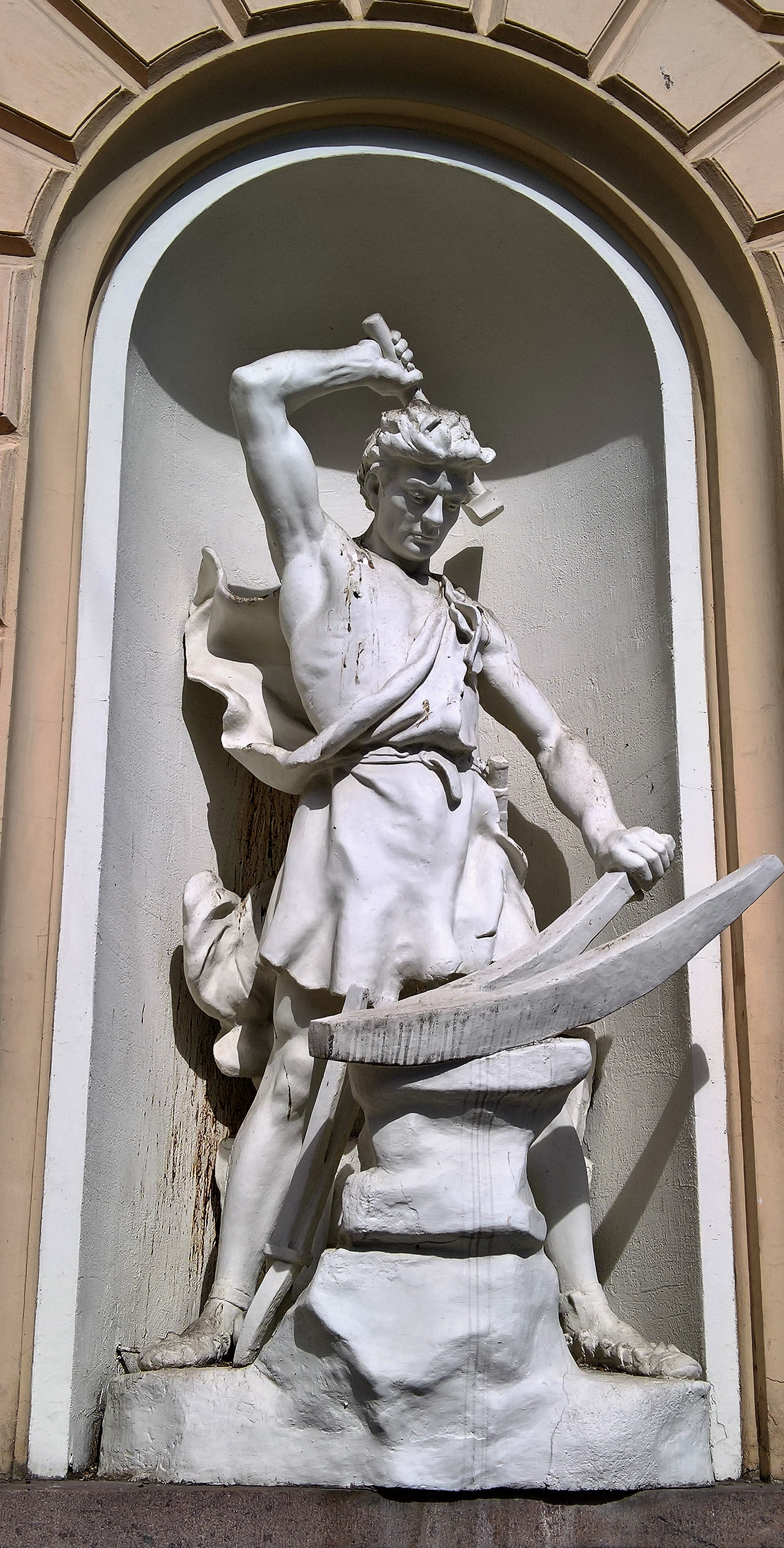
Ilmarinen, a major deity in Finnic paganism.

Ilmarinen is a major deity and former chief deity, in the form of a sky deity in Baltic Finnic paganism, alongside the Proto-Uralic religion until his replacement as the chief deity. Ilmarinen may have [possibly] also been a thunder deity under the name Ilmaričče. Other names for Ilmarinen are Ilmorinen and Ilmollini, as found from runes. Ilmarinen is also described in the pagan faith as the forger of the firmament, aurora borealis and the colors of the morning and evening. Ilmarinen was said to have the achievements of inventing iron and "striking the first fire" according to folklore.

He is also described as a blacksmith and is thought to have gained his smith status through Proto-Finnic contact with iron-working cultures such as the Balts or Germanic people.

==== Agricola's list of deities ====
In 1551, Mikael Agricola published a list of deities present across Tavastia and Karelia, most of the deities were also widespread and known to those who practiced the pagan faith outside of those regions.

Modern Finnish translation	English translation
Epäjumalia monia tässä, / muinoin palveltiin kaukana ja läsnä. Näitä kumarsivat hämäläiset / sekä miehet että naiset. TAPIO metsästä pyydykset soi / ja AHTI vedestä kaloja toi. VÄINÄMÖINEN virret takoi, / RAHKO kuun mustaksi jakoi. LIEKKIÖ ruohot, juuret ja puut / hallitsi ja senkaltaiset muut. ILMARINEN rauhan ja ilman teki / ja matkamiehet edesvei. TURSAS antoi voiton sodasta, / KRATTI murheen piti tavarasta. TONTTU huoneen menon hallitsi, / kuin PIRU monta villitsi. KAPEET myös heiltä kuun söivät. / KALEVANPOJAT niityt ja muut löivät.	Many idols here, / were once worshipped far and near. These were revered by the Tavastians / both men and women. TAPIO gave game from the forest / and AHTI brought fish from the water. VÄINÄMÖINEN forged songs, / RAHKO darkened the moon. LIEKKIÖ controlled herbs, roots, and trees / and others of that kind. ILMARINEN made peace and weather / and guided travelers. TURSAS gave victory in war, / KRATTI guarded treasures. TONTTU managed the household, / like PIRU who misled many. KAPEET also devoured the moon. / KALEVANPOJAT struck down meadows and more.
Vaan karjalaisten nämä olivat / epäjumalat, joita he rukoilivat. RONGOTEUS ruista antoi, / PELLONPEKKO ohran kasvun soi. VIRANKANNOS kauran kaitsi, / muutoin oltiin kaurasta paitsi. ÄKRÄS herneet, pavut, nauriit loi, / kaalit, liinat ja hamput edestoi. KÖNDÖS huhdat ja pellot teki, / kuin heidän epäuskonsa näki. Ja kun kevätkylvö kylvettiin, / silloin UKON malja juotiin. Siihen haettiin UKON vakka, / niin juopui piika ja akka. Sitten paljon häpeää siellä tehtiin, / kuin sekä kuultiin että nähtiin. Kun RAUNI UKON nainen härskyi, / jalosti UKKO pohjasta pärskyi. Se siis antoi ilman ja vedentulon. / KEKRI se lisäsi karjan kasvun. HIISI metsäläisistä soi voiton, / VEDENEMÄ vei kalat verkkoon. NYYRIKKI oravat antoi metsästä, / HITTAVAINEN toi jänikset pensaasta.	But these were the idols of the Karelians / whom they prayed to. RONGOTEUS gave rye, / PELLONPEKKO granted the growth of barley. VIRANKANNOS took care of oats, / otherwise there would be no oats. ÄKRÄS created peas, beans, and turnips, / brought forth cabbages, flax, and hemp. KÖNDÖS made the slash-and-burn fields and meadows, / as he saw their unbelief. And when the spring sowing was sown, / then UKKO'S toast was drunk. For this, they fetched UKKO'S festival, / so the maid and the old woman got drunk. Then much shame was done there, / as was heard and seen. When RAUNI, UKKO'S woman, was aroused, / nobly UKKO splashed from the bottom. He thus gave the weather and rainfall. / KEKRI increased the growth of the cattle. HIISI granted victory over the forest folk, / VEDENEMÄ brought the fish to the net. NYYRIKKI gave squirrels from the forest, / HITTAVAINEN brought hares from the bush.
Eikö se kansa vimmattu ole, / joka näitä uskoo ja rukoilee? Siihen PIRU ja synti veti heitä, / että he kumarsivat ja uskoivat näitä. Kuolleiden hautoihin ruokaa vietiin, / joissa valitettiin, paruttiin ja itkettiin. MENNINKÄISET myös heidän uhrinsa saivat, / koska lesket huolivat ja naivat. Palveltiin myös paljon muuta, / KIVIÄ, kantoja, tähtiä ja kuuta.	Isn't that a furious people, / who believe and pray to these? To this PIRU and sin drew them, / that they bowed to and believed in these. Food was taken to the graves of the dead, / where they lamented, mourned, and wept. MENNINKÄISET also received their sacrifices, / because widows grieved and remarried. They also served many other things, / HOLY STONES, stumps, stars, and the moon.

=== Haltija ===
Local animistic deities, known as haltijas or haltias, were also worshipped. Haltijas would act as spirits, gnome, or elf-like creatures in that guard, help, own, or protects something or somebody.

These haltijas could be male or female, and could take a human or another animal's form. Haltijas could be found everywhere in nature, both in the biotic and abiotic parts. Every human has a haltija, usually called haltijasielu (haltija soul) or luontohaltija (nature haltija), which is one of the three parts of a person's soul. The tradition blends with the Swedish tomte: the Finnish tonttu was a being analogous to haltija, but which lives in a building, like a home (kotitonttu) or a sauna (saunatonttu).

==== Maan haltija ====
Certain "haltiat", known as "maan haltija" (literally "tutelary of land"), guarded the property of an individual, including their house and livestock. Votive offerings would be given to these haltijas at a shrine, as thanks for the help given and also to prevent the haltija from causing harm.

Sometimes haltijas of certain families and farms acted against other families and their farms by stealing their wealth or making the animals infertile, for instance. Many local haltijas were believed to have originally been the sacred spirits of ancestors. In some cases a haltija was the first inhabitant of a house. Sometimes while making a new house a local spirit of nature could be "employed" to work as a maan haltija.

==== Väki ====
Different elements and environments had their own haltijas. Haltijas were grouped into types or races called väki. "Väki" has multiple connected meanings of "strength", "force", "throng", "military troop"; in the magical context, it referred ambiguously to magical strength and numbers. There were, for instance, different väki of water, forests, and graveyards.

Väkis could become angry if people acted in a disrespectful manner in their area. For example, cursing close to water made the väki of water angry. When angry, väkis could cause diseases and other misfortune to befall the human victim. Some väkis were always angry, like the väki of fire, explaining why every time you touch fire it burns, no matter how respectful you are around it.

Each tribe of väkis belonged to specific environments and if they were misplaced, problems occurred. For example, most väkis were misplaced if they attached to a human being, and they made the human being ill because they were in the wrong place. Illnesses were removed by sending väkis back to their right places. Shamans who cured diseases were returning the cosmic balance. For example, it was believed that on contact with the ground, as in falling on one's face, diseases could spread to the human, caused by the "väki" of the earth. Similarly, löyly (sauna steam) was believed to contain a väki spirit (löylyn henki), which could cause open wounds to get infected.

According to the concept of väki being divided in two (into power and folk of haltijas) the ancient Finns believed that the world was totally animistic in that no force of nature or intelligent life existed without väkis or haltijas. In other words, nothing happened in the universe without it being caused by a group of spirits. Even a person's soul consisted of many spirits.

== Cosmology ==
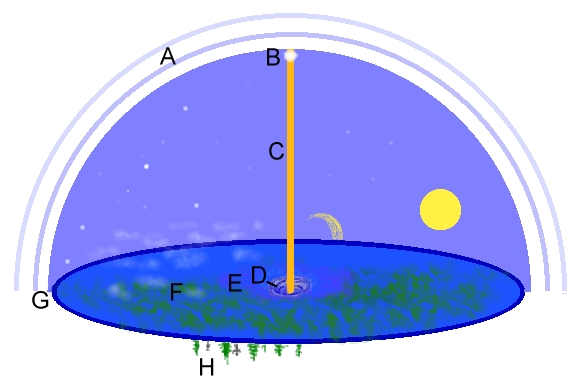

The Universe labelled as according to Finnic mythology

A. Firmament

B. Celestial pole

C. World pillar

D. Kinahmi

E. Pohjola

F. The known world

G. Lintukoto

H. Tuonela

=== Birth of the Universe ===
In Finnic mythology, there are two different theories on the creation of the universe and the earth. This includes the Sukeltajamyytti, in which the god sent a Black-throated loon into the Alkumeri (Finnish: Primeval sea) to collect mud and sand to build the earth. This myth is common in various Siberian (Chukchi, Yugaghir and Ainu), Tatar and North American native folklore.

Another creation theory is that the world was born from the egg of a waterfowl. This myth which is thought to be of origin from the Indian Subcontinent, is possibly to have come from Uralic interaction with Indo-Iranians. This myth however was only well known among the Sámi, Finns, Komi and Mordvins.

=== End of the World ===
There is said to be no eschatology (the end of the world) in Finnic mythology. However based on similarities in other Uralic beliefs, it can be assumed that Finnic paganism included the idea that the world is in cyclicity and that it will be recurring at regular intervals.

== Soul, death, and the afterlife ==
=== Soul ===
The Finnic pagan belief about the soul dictated that the human soul is composed of three different parts: henki, luonto and itse. Each of the three were autonomous beings on their own. Similar beliefs about multiple autonomous souls are found amongst other peoples speaking Uralic languages, such as the Khanty and Mansi, who believe in two souls: the shadow and the lili (löyly).

Henki (translated as "life", "breath" or "spirit", sometimes also referred to as löyly) was a person's life force, which presented itself as breathing, the beating of one's heart and the warmth of their body. Henki was received prior to birth and it left at the moment of death. The word hengetön (lit. "one without henki") can be used as a synonym for dead in the Finnish language even now. Henki share several similarities with the Norse idea of Andi which carry almost identical basic meaning.

Luonto (translated as "nature") was a guardian spirit or protector. Luonto has also been referred to as the haltija of a person. A strong willed, artistic or otherwise talented person was believed to have a strong haltija who granted them good luck and skills to complete their tasks well. A weak luonto could be strengthened by various spells and rituals. Luonto could leave a person's body without the person dying, but its lengthened absence would cause problems, such as alcoholism and other addictions. Unlike henki, luonto was not received prior to birth but instead either at the time of getting the first teeth or being given a name. A newborn child was thus considered to be particularly vulnerable. Luonto share several similarities with the overlapping ideas of Hamingja (luck), Fylgja (follower, companion guardian spirit), Vörðr (warden, a protection spirit) and individual norn (a person's fate goddess) in Norse belief.

Itse was a spirit received at the time of birth or a few days after. It was believed to define one's personality and receiving itse made one a person. In modern-day Finnish the word itse means "self", but in old days itse was different from one's self, minuus. Like luonto, itse could leave one's body without the person dying but long absence would cause illnesses and misery. Depressions, for instance, was seen as a result of having lost one's itse. If a person was diagnosed to be itsetön or luonnoton (without one's itse or without one's luonto), a shaman or a sage could try locating the missing part of the soul and bring it back. Although itse and luonto were usually lost after a traumatising event, it was possible to purposefully separate one's itse from their body. This was required if a missing part of the soul needed to be found. Itse could also leave the body to appear as an etiäinen (a sort of false arrival apparition). At the time of a person's death their itse joined the other deceased of the family or, in some cases, stayed among the living as a ghost. Itse share many similarities with the Norse concept of Hugr (mind, thought, willpower, courage), and to some extent also Vörðr (especially the false arrival apparition).

=== Burial ===
In some traditions, it was a habit to pause at a half-way point while transporting the dead body, from the dwelling to the graveyard. Here, a karsikko-marking was made on a big pine tree. The marking was for people to remember the person; and in the event that the spirit were to awaken and try to make its way back home from the graveyard, it would see its own karsikko-marking, then realize that it is dead and instead try to find the path to the spirit realm. A forest with karsikko-marked trees was a kind of supernatural barrier between dwellings of the living and the burial grounds.

After a person died there was a transitional period of thirty to forty days while their soul searched Tuonela, the land of dead, and tried to find their place there. During this period, the soul could visit its living relatives either as a ghost or in the form of an animal.

The soul visited relatives especially if it was unhappy. To please an unhappy soul, one would show respect by not speaking ill of the deceased or by having a sacrifice in the spirit's name.

After this transitional period, the soul moved permanently into Tuonela. However, the soul could still come back if it were unhappy, or if it were asked to return by its relatives who needed help.

Some souls were not able to settle down or were not welcomed in Tuonela, and they continued haunting, i.e. bastard children who were killed and buried outside a cemetery usually ended up as permanent haunters of some place, typically screaming in terror, until someone digs up their bodies, blesses them, and buries them in a graveyard.

=== Ancestor veneration ===
People were afraid of ghosts, but spirits of ancestors could also help their living relatives, and they were asked to help. A shaman could be sent to Tuonela to ask for knowledge of spirits or even to take a spirit to the world of living as luonto. A Spirit of the dead had to be honoured by giving them sacrifices. Places where sacrifices were given to ancestors were called Hiisi ( = sacred forest, also a kind of open air temple, often included the Offering-stone, uhrikivi, collective monument for the dead of the family). Christianity held hiisi to be evil creatures and places. The old sacred places were often desecrated by being used as the building sites for the churches of the new religion, and the old sacred trees were hacked down.

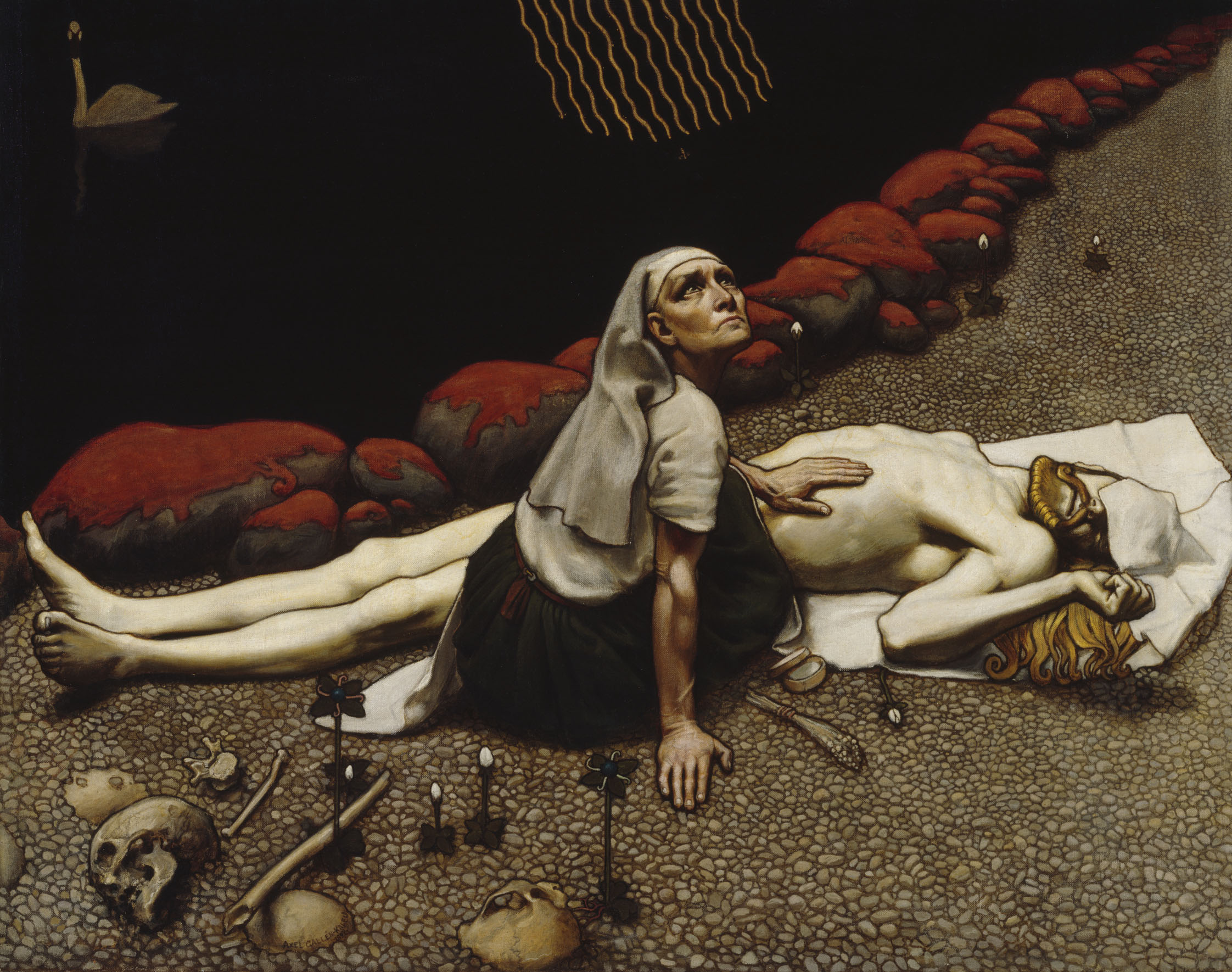
Lemminkäisen äiti by Akseli Gallen-Kallela. A depiction of the underworld, Tuonela, from a myth found in the Kalevala.

=== Afterlife ===
The Finns believed in a place of afterlife called Tuonela, or sometimes also called Manala. In most traditions, it was situated underground or at the bottom of a lake, though sometimes it was said to exist on the other side of a dark river. Tuonela was ruled over by the god Tuoni, and his wife, the goddess Tuonetar.

Tuonela was a dark and lifeless place, where the dead were in a state of eternal sleep. Shamans were sometimes able to reach the spirits of their dead ancestors by traveling to Tuonela in a state of trance created by rituals. He had to make his way over the Tuonela river by tricking the ferryman. While in Tuonela, the shaman had to be careful not to get caught: the living were not welcome there. Shamans who were caught could end up decaying in the stomach of a giant pike fish with no hope of returning to normal life. If the shaman died during the trance ritual, it was believed that he had been caught by the guards at Tuonela.

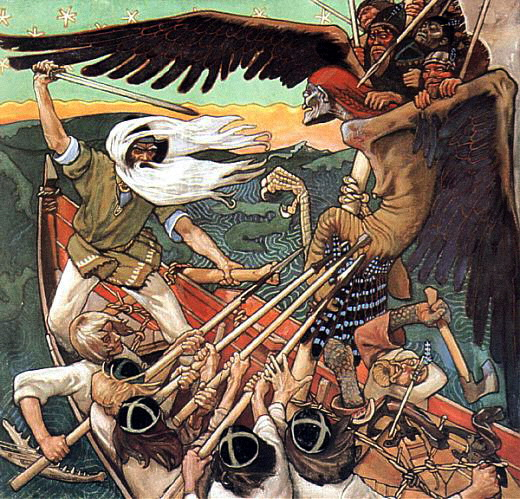
An illustration of the hero Väinämöinen from Finnic mythology.

== Mythology ==
The pagan Finns had many myths about their gods and their great heroes. Because they lived in a non-literate society, the stories were taught orally as folklore, and they were not written down. Finnic mythology survived Christianisation by being told as myths. Many of these myths were later written down in the 19th century as the Kalevala, which was created to be a national epic of Finland by Elias Lönnrot.

== Sanctuaries ==
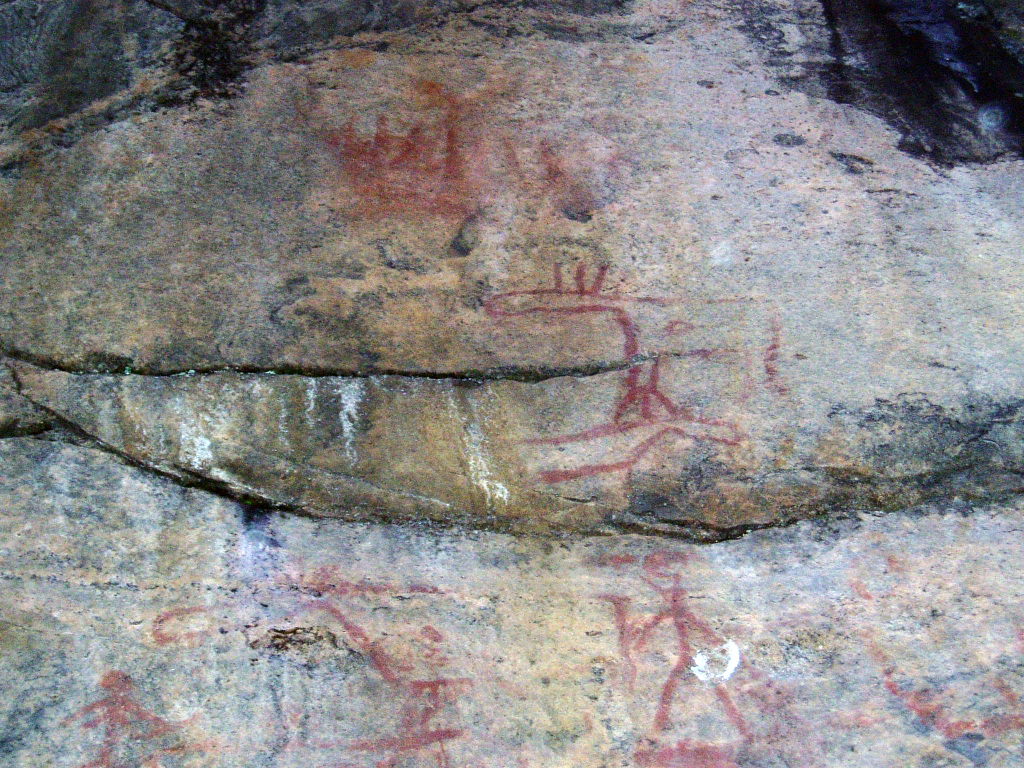
Rock painting at Astuvansalmi, showing elk, humans and a boat.

=== Rock paintings ===
Rock paintings were common in Baltic Finnic paganism, and were often done with red clay during the Stone Age. These paintings would often symbolize common animals such as deer and fish, along with humans and palm prints. Folk poetry may have also been preserved on these rocks, however they have not survived on these rock paintings, and instead have been carried through generations via oral tradition. It is believed that most of these rock paintings were done by the Comb Ceramic culture.

=== Hiisi ===
Hiisi or sacred woods were places where people often went to during pilgrimages or served as a burial site to take sacrifices. Within these sacred woods, there would often be a special enclosed area for sacrifices, in which it was forbidden to enter, except for those who were doing the sacrificing to the deities. In Baltic Finnic folklore, hiisi sites were also likened to be the creation of the Hiidet (giants), and through oral tradition, jotuni or giants were said to dwell in hiisi sites.

=== Wetlands ===
Wetlands, such as bogs, swamps, springs and streams were holy places, especially for the use of sacrificing. The archeological findings of flint and tinderbox has shown that they have been used for the execution and disposal of those unwanted people in the tribe. Children who were born out of wedlock or those who had disabilities would also be killed in the wetlands. The word "Suomi" (Finnish: Finland) is also thought to come from the word "Suo" (Finnish: Swamp/bog).

== Sacred animals ==
=== Bears ===
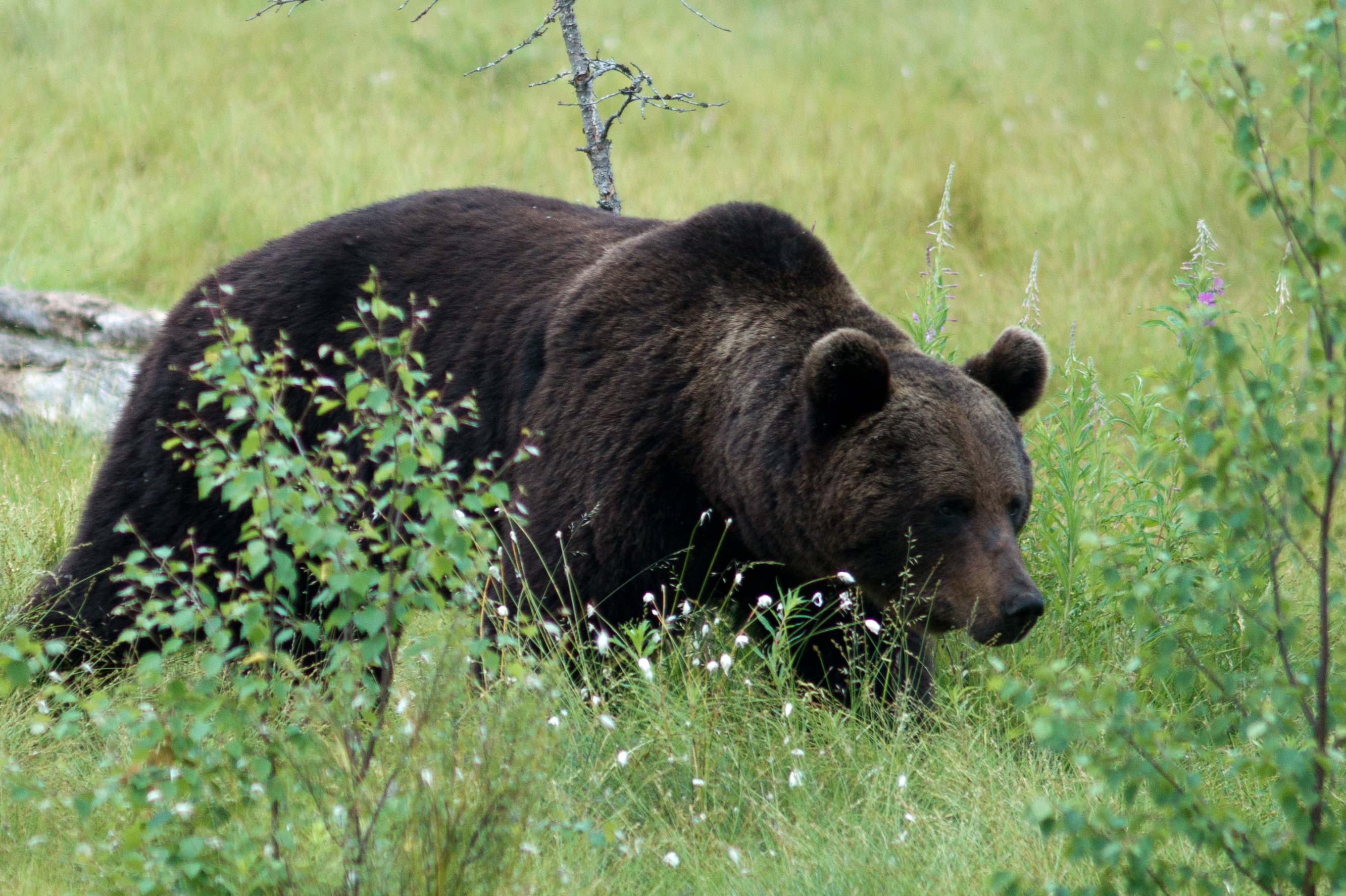
The bear, Otso, was a sacred animal to the Finnic pagans.

Finns heavily relied on hunting for survival before and during the Middle Ages. As such the animals that they hunted became vital to their survival, and they were treated with respect.

The bear was considered sacred and was venerated in the pagan beliefs of the Finns. Peijaiset, which was a memorial feast held to honour a slain animal, the most common animal to hold peijaiset to was the bear, and during the peijaiset, the bear was eaten and the bones were buried, and the skull placed on a venerated pine tree known as kallohonka, kallohonkas were sacred places and it may have been a metaphor for the world tree. Peijaiset are also an important part of other Finno-Ugrics (Khanty and Mansi) and Siberians (Yugurs).

According to a pagan folk belief, the first bear came to people's dwellings to do evil, however a Giant slapped the bear on the ear, and the bear had to beg for mercy. A deal was made: the bear promised to stay in the forest from then on, eat berries, and dig up common ants; the bear also promised to sleep all winter soundly in his nest. However, if it came back, people would then shoot and spear it. It kept its promise otherwise, which now sometimes ate cattle from the forest, from its own area. The story also follows a belief about why domestic animals came to the attention of people: to escape from the bear.

=== Other animals ===
In Karelia and Eastern Finland, before going hunting, hunters would pray to the emuu, the ancestral mother of the animal species being hunted, for help. The word emuu is Karelian and is related to the word emo "animal mother". Each species had its own emuu.

From ancient drawings, petroglyphs, it is clear that the elk was a very important animal. Elk is also very important to other peoples of the region, such as the Komis, who depict their sky god Jenmar as half-human and half-elk. It appears much more than bears do, and it is theorised that the bear was such a holy animal that it was forbidden to depict it. Also, the bear's name was almost forbidden to say, so many euphemisms were developed. The most usual Baltic Finnic word for bear in modern language, karhu, is just one of the many euphemisms, and it means "rough fur." Among the many names of bear otso is probably the original "real" name, as suggested by the widespread use of the word otso and related words among many of the Uralic languages. Many euphemisms for bear are local.

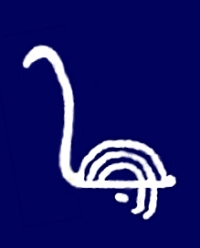
Swan and egg, based on petroglyphs of Karelia

Many water birds were holy for Finns and other Baltic Finns. They were often depicted on petroglyphs. It was believed that if you killed a water bird, you would die soon after. The holiest water bird was the swan. With its long neck, it could look to all the levels of the world, including Tuonela, the land of the dead. Birds are found often in Uralic mythology. For example, there are many stories about a bird creating the world. A very common Uralic myth is where a hunter (Finnish: Lemminkäinen, Mari Salij) travels to the underworld to marry a woman and comes across the primordial waterbird on the river of the underworld, the hunter shoots the waterbird with his bow, but the waterbird escapes and terrible things happen to the hunter. In many traditions it was believed that the world was created by the egg of a bird. In other traditions it was believed that the world was created on mud that bird took in its beak while diving.

In Karelia it was believed that a bird brings the soul to a newborn baby, and that the same bird takes the soul with it when that person dies. This soul-carrying bird was called sielulintu, "soul-bird". In some traditions people carried artifacts depicting their sielulintu. Sielulintu was believed to guard their souls while they slept. After the person died, the artifact-bird was inserted to sit on the cross at the person's grave. Such crosses with soul birds still exist in graveyards in Karelia. This is one example how Christian and Pagan beliefs still existed side by side hundreds of years after the Christianisation of the Finnish and Karelian people.

== Shamanism ==
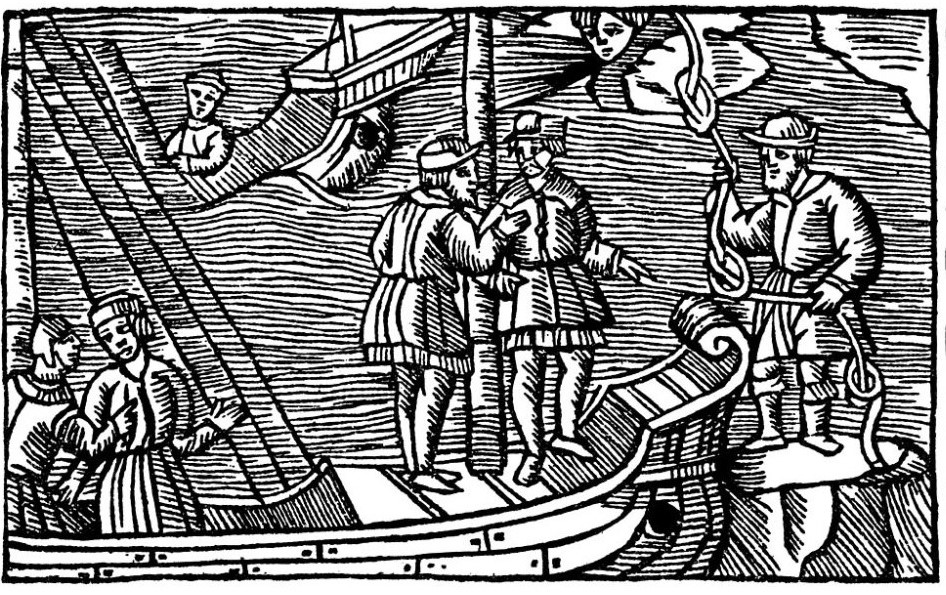
Finns selling wind

Shamanism played a big part in Baltic Finnic paganism, as it did (and still does) in Siberian (Chukchi, Yugaghir and Ainu) as well as in other Finno-Ugric pagan faiths. A tietäjä (shaman, literally "one who knows") is a wise and respected person in the community, believed to have a special relationship with the spirit world. Shamans go into a trance to commune with spirits and ancestors or to take a journey into the spirit realm, the shaman would go into these trances via aid, such as witch drums, bear teeth and paws, and dancing. During trances shamans may ask their ancestors or various nature spirits for guidance. They believe that nature has the answers to all questions. Shamans were typically men of high standing in the local society, often landed peasants; it was thought that wealth was evidence of magic powers.

Shamans would most often play the roles of medical doctors, and would receive their medical information through their trances by visiting spirits and deities. Shamans would also have important religious influence, as tietäjä were fortunetellers, prophets and priests.

Among the Finns' western neighbours, the Norse of Scandinavia, it was a common belief that the Finns were wizards. In the Norse sagas, inclusion of a Finnish element almost always signifies a supernatural aspect to the story. According to tales, foreign seafarers bought ropes tied with three knots from Finns. By opening one knot, a seaman could raise a wind to make his ship go faster. However, opening all three knots would raise a storm. Finnish wizards were known and feared by neighbouring peoples around the Baltic Sea.

== Christianisation ==
The first signs of the christianisation of the Baltic Finnic peoples are from the 6th century with the arrival of portable crucifix artifacts, however Christianity began to spread more rapidly by trade in the Viking Age. The main evidence for the arrival of Christianity to Finland was a shift of burial practices, with a large uptick in burials, instead of cremation, and due to the directions of the graves. In the 11th century large-scale missionary activity began to spread to Finland and Karelia, as they were surrounded by Catholic and Eastern Orthodox countries. Christianity was gradually being spread via trade before the First Swedish Crusade, which occurred in the 12th century, specifically c. 1150–1157, which resulted in Sweden conquering territory from Finnish tribes. The Treaty of Nöteborg practically became the dividing line for Catholicism and Eastern Orthodoxy in Fennoscandia, with Eastern Karelia eventually becoming Eastern Orthodox. Despite the Northern Finnic tribes having been conquered by Sweden and Novgorod, the populace largely stuck to the Baltic Finnic pagan faith even as Christianity became more institutionalized, for example via the Bishopric of Turku by Sweden, as Religious syncretism was largely commonplace for Baltic Finns, with the stories combining Jesus and Väinämöinen, as well as the stories about Ukko and the God of Christianity having lived side-by-side and mixed even well into the 19th century, especially in places like Kainuu or Karelia.

The Protestant Reformation resulted in an lower barrier-of-entry for Church activity, largely thanks to an increase in the use of the vulgar tongue in churches, due to Lutheranism and Mikael Agricola's translation of the New Testament ("Se Wsi Testamenti") into the Finnish language.

== Songs and incantations ==
In the seventeenth to nineteenth centuries, Baltic Finnic folk magic often incorporated chanted or sung incantations. These incantations might bring healing or presage a tietäjä's (shaman, literally "one who knows") ecstatic trance. In the twentieth century, an American researcher in Minnesota reported sung charms for summoning cattle, avoiding hiccups, and avoiding cold based on interviews with a Finnish immigrant.

== Baltic Finnic Neopagan movements ==
In the 20th century, with the rise of the neopagan movement across the world, Finnish neopaganism arose as a reconstructed form of the old religion. It is mainly practiced in Finland where it has had an official minority religion status since 2013. Finnish neopaganism accounts for a relatively small percentage of the population. In 2020, the registered religious community of Finnish neopaganism, Karhun kansa (The Folk of the Bear), had approximately 80 members.

The Jumiõis, symbol of Taaraism and Maausk

In Estonia, Estonian neopaganism was also founded in the early 20th century, Estonian neopaganism adapted many beliefs and myths of the ancient faith. There are two major sects of Estonian neopaganism, which includes Maausk and Taaraism. Maausk is considered an 'umbrella' of native faith movements, encompassing deities, nature worship and earth religion, while Taaraism is a monistic faith centered around Tharapita, who is a pagan deity similar to Ukko. There were 3,860 self-declared adherents of Maausk and 1,770 adherents of Taarausk in 2021, in Estonia.

== Holidays ==
In Finland under Swedish rule, the practice of Baltic Finnic paganism was forbidden from the 1600s onwards, however there were still sacred groves where the pagan faith was practiced during the 1700s, which churchmen and authorities tried to eradicate. Among the current official mainstream holidays in Finland, Juhannus (known as Ukon juhla before christianisation) and Kekri were originally celebrations that belonged to the pagan faith.

Many ancient holiday practices have gone extinct over the years, however holidays such as Talvennapa, Vakkajuhlat, Helavalkeat and Karhunpäivä are still sometimes celebrated by smaller communities such as village associates or pagans.

== See also ==
- Estonian mythology
- Finnic deities
- Uralic neopaganism
- Norse Paganism
