= Sampsa Pellervoinen =

Finnish deity of vegetation

- Haltija of vegetation
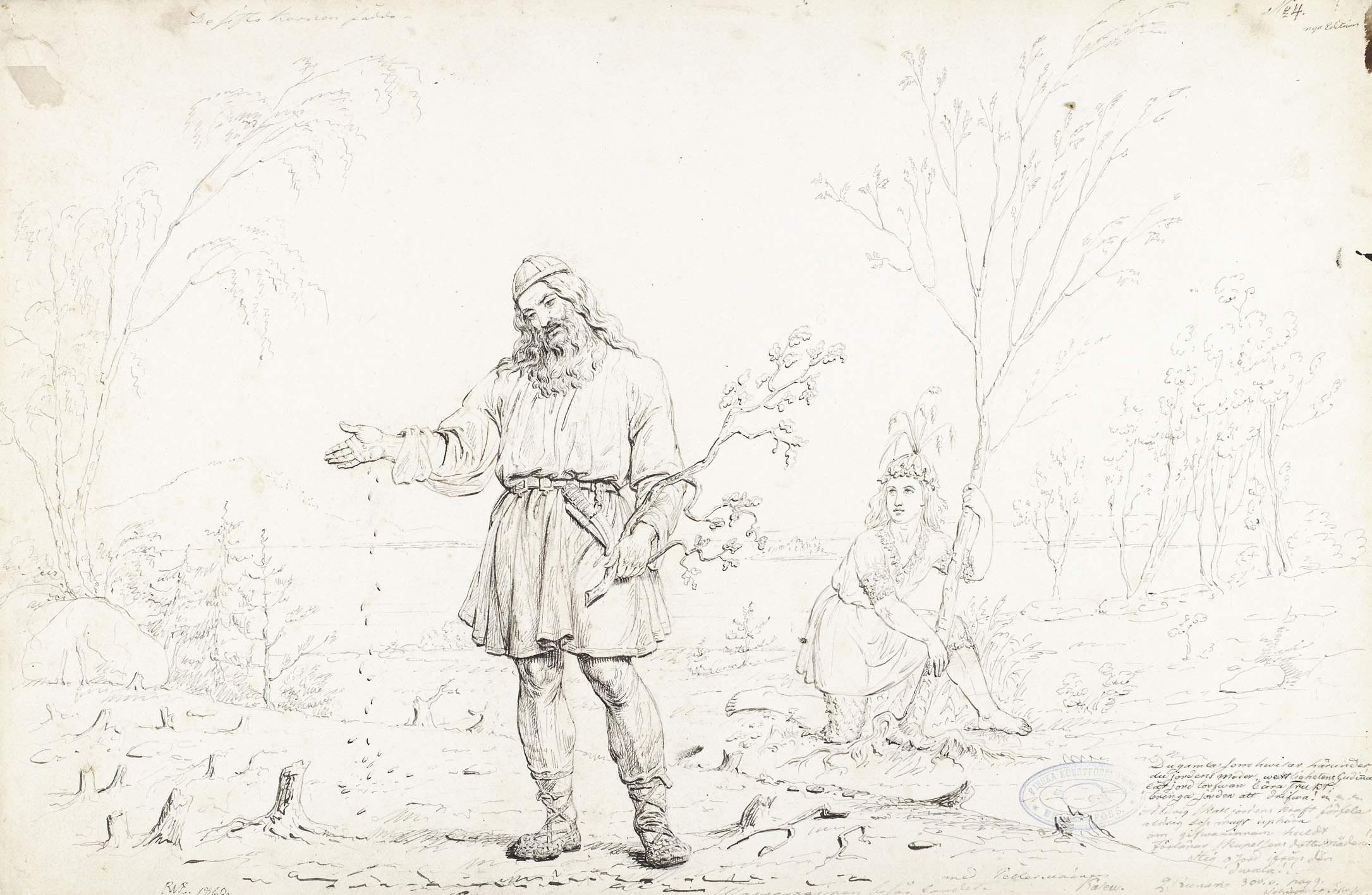
- In the front: Väinämöinen; In the back: Sampsa; Robert Wilhelm Ekman (1860)
- Other names: Forest Finns: Ämssä; Ingria: Pellervo, Pellervoi, Sämpsä, Sämpsö, Sämpsöi; Kainuu: Samsa, Sämpsä; Karelia: Ahti, Antti, Lellervoinen, Pellervo, Pellervö, Pekka, Pervetsoinen, Saksa, Samppo, Sampsa, Sampsan, Sampso, Šampšo, Sampu, Samsa, Sapsu, Sellervoinen, Sempsä, Sempsen, Simpsan, Sämpsä, Sämpsermöine, Sämsä; Ostrobothnia: Seutervoinen, Sentervoinen, Sämpsä, Sämsä; Savonia: Pellermöinen, Pellervo, Samps', Sompsa, Sämse, Sämsä
- Abode: Earth
- Animals: Vennon härkä Uljamoinen (ox)
- Gender: Male
- Ethnic group: Finns, Karelians

Sampsa or Sämpsä Pellervoinen is a haltija (supernatural guardian) of vegetation in Finnish mythology. He sows all vegetation on earth, all the forests, swamps, meadows, and rock lands too. He appears as a god of fertility who has to be ritually awakened every summer in some regions.

== Name ==
In the Karelian Isthmus, sämpsykkä means a plant. In Ingria, sämpsykkä or sämpsä-heinä means the Scirpus sylvaticus (wood clubrush). It could be a loan from Germanic: German Simse means a bulrush. Pellervo could be a reference to either pellava 'flax' or pelto 'field'. Martti Haavio thought Pellervo comes from pellet 'ground, humus'. According to Heikki Kirkinen, Sampsa's name could be derived from Saint Sampson the Hospitable, a saint of the Eastern Churches.

== In runic songs ==
He was first mentioned by Christfried Ganander in 1789 as Sämsä or Sämpsä, a faun, a son of Pellervoinen and the planter of trees. His helper was the strong draft ox named Vennon härkä Uljamoinen. Ganander also wrote down a rare runic song where Sämsä poika Sentervoinen prepares his boat in order to go sailing.

In Eastern Finland, Sampsa is primarily known in the runic song describing the synty (mythical origin) of trees. Despite this, it seems likely that his original role was as a protector of field crops. The most comprehensive story of the awakening of Sampsa describes how the wealthy land owner Ahti tries to get someone to awaken Sampsa. A wolf tries to do so, hoping to get a hefty reward, but fails. Summer boy, who doesn't think of a reward, goes to awaken Sampsa and is successful. Sampsa then proceeds to sow all vegetation. In some versions, it is winter boy who first fails to awaken Sampsa. The place where Sampsa is sleeping is described as an island without trees. This story includes the line: Ennen Ahti maita puuttu, / Ennenkun Sämpsä siemeniä ("Ahti would sooner run out of land than Sämpsä out of seeds").

In some versions of these poems he inseminates either his sister or his mother to be able to provide fertility for fields and orchards. The incest version is likely born out of foreign influence, as a fertility god mates with an earth mother in multiple religions. Runic songs also refer to Maaemä 'earth mother', Maatar or Mannutar, the mother in earth. According to Uno Harva, when some runic songs mention that Sampsa "laid with his mother", the mother in question is Maaemä. The parts referring to the shame of incest are likely taken from Kullervo's story and only later attached to Sampsa.

The Forest Finns knew of Ämssä who lived in a tussock, which Harva has connected to Sampsa, for the Ingrians knew the concept of Sämpsä's tussock. It could have been the first tuft with green grass, the first place where the vegetation haltija shows signs of waking up.

In Ingria, the song of Sampsa has been traditionally sung during festivities for Ukko on June 29 in connection with vakkue.

== In the Kalevala ==
In some runic songs, the sowing is done with the help of small pieces of the magical device sampo. In the Kalevala, Elias Lönnrot changed the order of things so that the sowing happens before the forging of sampo, in the second poem of the Kalevala during the land's creation. Sampsa is commonly described as a slender youth carrying either a bag or a basket around his neck.

== Comparisons ==
Kaarle Krohn compared Sampsa to Scandinavian fertility deities Freyr and Njord. Raymond Chambers has called attention to the possible connection between Sampsa and Scyld Scefing from Beowulf.
