= Maaemä =

Estonian and Finnish goddess of earth

- Earth Mother; Mistress of Earth
- Other names: Maaema, Maaemo, Maan emonen
- Abode: Earth
- Gender: Female
- Ethnic group: Estonians, Finns, Karelians
- Consort: Assumed Ukko

Equivalents
- Sámi: Máttaráhkká

Maaemä (Finnish) or Maaema (Estonian) is a goddess or earth itself in Finnish and Estonian mythologies. She is sometimes called the wife of Ukko but this is not certain.

== Traditions ==
=== In Finnish runic songs ===
In runic songs, the earth itself is sometimes called maaemä 'earth mother'. It is, varying by song, said that maaemä is a mother, or that there is a mother who resides in or came from maaemä. Maaemä is sometimes set as the opposite of a father in the sky or Ukko: Ukon voima taivahasta, / maasta maan emoisen voima! ("Ukko's power from the sky, the power of the little earth mother from the earth!").

According to Uno Harva, when some runic songs mention that the vegetation haltija Sampsa Pellervoinen "laid with his mother", the mother in question is Maaemä. Due to later Christian influence, earth is even called the creator mother of Jesus.

A South Savo runic song invokes her, calling her the one who raised snakes from the ground. A North Savo runic song explains how the Mistress of Earth brushed her hair and from a bristle of the brush, a snake was formed. A Kainuu runic song describes a stone as something that "tastes like the earth of Maatar" (lit. 'Lady Earth', Maattaren maan makunen).

=== In Estonian rituals ===
The earth deities were honoured during celebrations such as solstices. Offerings of milk products were taken into the Midsummer bonfire to ensure good luck and harvest, saying: "Dear earth god, accept this small amount!" (Armas maajumal, lepi selle vähesegagi!). Elsewhere on Midsummer, mothers with their children went around the bonfire thrice and then secretly took offerings of food to sacrificial stones and said: "Maaema, you gave it to me and now I bring it to you; accept what I've received from your hand!" (Maaema, sa andsid mulle, nüüd toon sulle; võta vastu, mis ma sinu käest olen saanud!). One would not want to hit the ground or field, for "earth is our mother". Similarly, it was said that if you stabbed the ground, it was like stabbing your own mother in the chest. There are records of the Estonians of Opochetsky Uyezd (Kraasna Estonians) giving drink offerings to the earth god by pouring it to the ground. Similar drink offerings were also given to the Estonian lightning god Pikne. Kraasna Estonians were ordered by the Russian Empire to cease their sacrificial offerings in the 1860s. In 1901, the locals said the crops used to grow better back when they were still allowed to respect the earth gods. Annõ Kiriljevna, whose brother had been a priest of the earth gods, told with tears in her eyes how hard it had been to leave the earth gods, who had brought her so much good, without food and drink. She was comforted by a dream she had had, where the gods had sat in a sacred yard filled with food and drinks, saying: "You thought we would die when you're not giving us anything, but we have plenty here".

== Name ==
In Finnish, she is referred to with various terms, such as Maaemä/Maaemo 'earth mother' or Maan emonen 'little mother of earth'. In Estonia, there were multiple beings or terms associated with the earth: maaema 'earth mother', maaisa 'earth father', maajumal 'earth god', maavaim 'earth spirit', and maahaldjas 'earth haltija', in northern Estonia. Maaema was the primary term, as earth itself was seen as the earth mother.

Kaarle Krohn connected maaemä to various other terms which appear in runic songs: maan emäntä 'mistress of earth' and akka manteren alainen 'old woman under the land'. Names he attached to her include Maatar (Kainuu, lit. 'Lady Earth'), Mannutar (Karelia, lit. 'Lady Ground'), Maanhutar (Savonia), Manutar (Karelia and Savonia), and the widely known Mammotar. These figures appear in runic songs as the mother of stones and snakes. A White Karelian poem gives Manutar the synonyms Penkeretär and Kunnotar, which made Krohn wonder if she is the same as Kunotar who, according to Christfried Ganander, gave birth to Väinämöinen's father. He suggests the connection of this Kunnotar and the Swedish word qvinna 'woman'.

Ganander also called her Akka 'old woman; wife', which parallels the name of Ukko 'old man; husband'.

=== Relation to Mammotar ===
Ganander listed Mammotar as the patroness of stones and the mother of snakes, a witch who lives underground. He connected Mammelainen to Hecate. In some runic songs of the origin of snakes, snakes were born out of Syöjätär's spit, but there are also versions where a snake is born out of a bristle of the brush of Maanhuten maan emäntä 'Maanhuten, Mistress of Earth'; Maanhuten could also be Maanhutar or Manutar according to Adolf Ivar Arwidsson). In Martti Haavio's opinion, Mammotar comes from Latin mater or Greek mḗtēr 'mother' and refers to the mother of demons such as Lilith. The name does sometimes appear alongside Syöjätär, other demons, and Lemmetär, and a Kainuu rune singer claimed maaja in the Maajatar version of the name means 'wrath'—or at least that is a note the collector of the runic song, Julius Krohn, wrote down.

== Interpretations ==
In 1789, Ganander wrote in Mythologia Fennica that Maan-Emonen is the wife of Ukko and someone who gave strength. Thus, he equated Maan-Emonen with Rauni, an unclear name mentioned by Mikael Agricola in 1551. It is not clear whether the name Rauni refers to Ukko himself, Ukko's wife, or a whole separate fertility-related deity based on Freyr (such as Virankannos). Ganander's statement on the marriage of Ukko and Maaemä is an assumption fully based on the fact that they were "prayed to at the same time".

If she is the same as Manteren akka mentioned in runic songs, then her equivalent would be the Sámi goddess Máttaráhkká, who helps with giving birth. Among the Sámi in Kola Peninsula, mändir-ähke means a "parent's grandmother". With this, Krohn came to the conclusion that Manteren akka is a female ancestor buried in the ground who was primarily worshipped by women, and respecting earth as the mother of all the living is a later adaptation for the Finns.

== Epithets ==
Epithet	Epithet meaning	Regions
Maanutar, maan emäntä Mander, maan emäntä Marattara, maan emäntä Manutar, maan emäntä Maanhutar, maan emäntä	'Maanutar, mistress of earth'	Ladoga Karelia, North Savo, South Savo, White Karelia
Akka manteren alanen	'Old woman below the ground'	Ladoga Karelia, North Karelia, North Ostrobothnia, White Karelia
Manun eukko, maan emäntä	'Old woman of the soil, mistress of earth'	Olonets Karelia
Manutar, valittu vaimo	'Manutar, chosen woman/wife'	White Karelia
Penkeretär perehen äiti	'Penkeretär, mother of the family'	White Karelia
Akka angervon alanen	'Old woman below the meadowsweets'	White Karelia
