= Horagalles =

Thunder god in Sámi mythology

- God of the sky, lightning, thunder
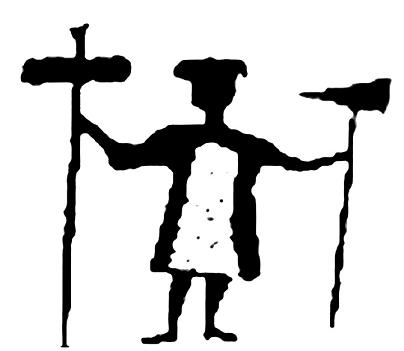
- Depiction of Horagalles from a Sámi shaman drum found in Norway. The drum symbols were copied by the Christian priest Thomas von Westen in the 18th century.
- Weapon: Hammers, fiery bow and arrows
- Symbol: Rowan tree (allegedly)
- Consort: Ravdna (allegedly)

Equivalents
- Norse: Thor
- Finnic: Ukko

In Sámi shamanism, Western Sámi Horagalles, often equated with Eastern Sámi Tiermes, Baján, and Aijeke or Äijih (lit. 'old man'), is the thunder god. He is depicted as a wooden figure with a nail in the head and with a hammer, or occasionally on shaman drums, two hammers.

There is a theory that Tiermes is the original Sámi sky god, while West and South Sámi sky god Radien-attje was born later out of Norse pagan and Christian influences.

== Names ==
The name Horagalles does not occur in older dictionaries of Sámi languages, for instance in the mid-19th century. He is often equated with Tiermes; in 1673 Johannes Scheffer, who did not use the name Horagalles, wrote that when Aijeke thundered, he was called Tiermes. There is considerable regional variation in the names; Horagalles (with its various spellings, including Thoragalles) is characteristically southern Sámi and Tiermes and variants being commonly used among Northern Sámi, and the rainbow is referred to by a variety of names referring to thunder.

Early scholars noted the similarities between Horagalles and the Norse thunder-god Thor and that some Sámi called him Thoron or simply Thor, and were unsure which had influenced which. But the name Horagalles is now interpreted as a loanword from the Old Norse Þórr Karl 'the Old Man Thor', 'Thor, the Elder', or 'Thor fellow', "Thor Karl" (possibly from Norwegian Torrekall), or Swedish Torsmannen 'the thunder man'. This is not certain as a Southern Sámi variation of the name is Hovrengaellies, from hovre 'make noise'.

Among eastern Sámi groups, the thunder god is called Tiermes or Tiirmes, in Northern Sámi Dierpmis (no longer used but was known among Sea Sámi). The word could be a loanword from a Pre-Finno-Ugric substrate language or related to the Khanty thunder god Torem.

Baján (also spelled Pajonn, Pajǟn, Bajánalmmái and Pajanolmai) is the commonly known name of the thunder god in Northern Sámi, from the word pad'd'i 'above'. According to Zacharias Plantin, Pajonn is an alias of Doragass, which in turn is a distorted version of Horagalles. This name might have been loaned into one of the names of the Finnish god Ukko, Pajainen.

Äijih (also Aijeke and Ajeke, Northern Sami: Áddjá), 'old man', is the primary name of the thunder god in Inari Sámi. According to tradition and archeological evidence, he had a local cult on the Äijih-sualui island in Inari, where reindeer antlers and metal objects were still sacrificed in the late 19th century.

== Characteristics and functions ==
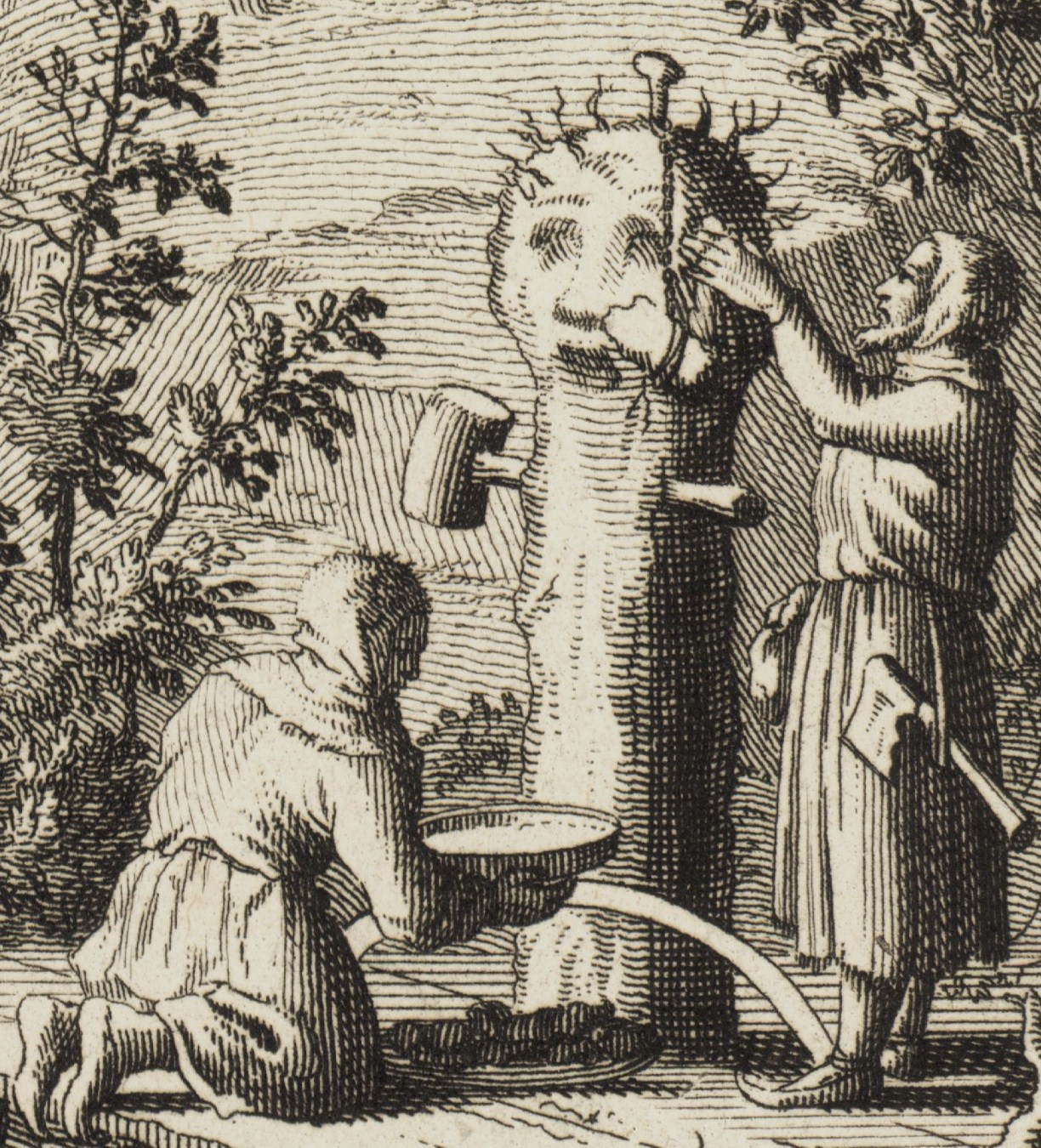
Sámi people worshipping Horagalles or Tiermes. Copper engraving by Bernard Picart from Cérémonies et coutumes religieuses de tous les peuples du monde (1723–43)

Idols of Horagalles are made of wood and have a nail or spike and a piece of flint in the head. He has a hammer called Wetschera, Aijeke Wetschera, or Ajeke veċċera 'grandfather's hammer'. The Lule Sámi people built a stage for the idol of Horagalles holding a hammer, while one description states that Áddjá's tree had to be out of birch and be set upside down.

Horagalles and Tiermes are described as the god of the sky, thunder and lightning, the rainbow, weather, oceans and lakes. He punishes "hurtful demons" or "evil spirits" (i.e., trolls) who frequent the rocks and mountains; Horagalles destroys them with his lightning, shoots them with his bow, or dashes their brains out with his hammer. The rainbow is his bow, "Aijeke dauge". For Eastern Sámi groups, the sky god Radien-attje seems to have fused into Tiermes, as Tiermes is also seen as the ruler over human life, health, and well-being. There is also a theory that Tiermes is the original Sámi sky god, while Radien-attje emerged later. According to the mid-18th century Cérémonies et coutumes religieuses de tous les peuples du monde, "Thiermes or Thoron" is the first in a trinity, of whom the other members are Storjunkare and Baivre or Jumala. In Kildin Sámi, the rainbow is tiirmes-jukks 'Tiirmes's bow', and the lightning is tiirmes-tooll 'Tiirmes's fire'. A bow and fiery arrows could then be the thunder god's original weapon.

The thunder god was also capable of hurting the Sámi and their sacred sites. A noaidi could connect with him through drumming and yoiking to release reindeer from a spell or hurt enemies. Among eastern Sámi groups, the thunder god has a closer connection to the creation and destruction of the world: Skolt Sámi tradition states that thunder taught the world's first humans how to build a goahti, Ter Sámi myth states that he is the highest sky god capable of destroying the world, and in general eastern Sámi eschatology, he is a heavenly hunter hunting a heavenly reindeer on the sky and when he shoots it with a fiery arrow, the world will fall into chaos and set on fire, the sky collapsing.

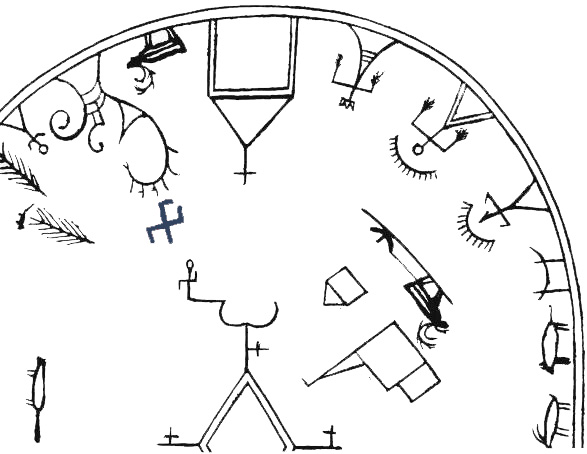
The two hammers of the thunder god depicted as a blue cross on a late 18th-century shaman drum from Porsanger Municipality, Western Finnmark, Norway, described by the Christian missionary Knud Leem.

According to Jacob Fellman, Horagalles's consort is called Ravdna, and the red berries of the rowan tree are sacred to her. The name Ravdna resembles North Germanic names for the tree, such as Old Norse reynir, and according to the Prose Edda book Skáldskaparmál, the rowan is called "the salvation of Thor" because Thor once saved himself by clinging to it. It has therefore been theorized that the Norse goddess Sif, Thor's wife, was once conceived of in the form of a rowan to which Thor clung. Uno Harva raised doubts on the existence of Ravdna as she is not mentioned in other writing but Fellman's, and Fellman refers to the thunder god with the Finnish name Ukko in this instance. Harva suggested Fellman might have been simply trying to find a Sámi equivalent for Rauni, as the Skolts had never heard of the thunder god having a wife.

=== Horagalles depicted on Sámi shaman drums ===
On Sámi shaman drums Horagalles is occasionally depicted with a sledgehammer in one hand and a cross-hammer in the other, or symbolized by two crossed hammers. He made thunder and lightning with one hammer and withdrew them with the other to prevent harm to the Sámi or their animals.
