= Perkele =

Finnish swear word; former name of a deity

Perkele (pronounced [ˈperkele]) is a Finnish word meaning 'evil spirit' and a popular Finnish profanity, used similarly to the English phrase God damn, although it is considered much more profane. It is most likely the most internationally known Finnish curse word.

== Etymology ==
The name is of Proto-Indo-European origin; *Perkʷūnos is the reconstructed name of the god of thunder.

Some researchers consider Perkele to be an original name of the thunder god Ukko, the chief god of the Finnish pagan pantheon, but this view is not shared by all researchers. There are related words in other Finnic languages: in Estonian, põrgu means hell, in Karelian perkeleh means an evil spirit.

=== Influence of Christianity ===
As Finland was Christianized, the ancient pre-Christian deities came to be regarded as demons. This led to the use of "Perkele" as a translation for "Devil" in the Finnish translation of the Bible. Later, in other translations, the word was rendered as paholainen (the evil one).

== See also ==
- Perkele! Kuvia Suomesta – a 1971 Finnish documentary film
- Piru (spirit)
- Perun
