= Rauni (deity) =

Finnish deity

Rauni (Finnish pronunciation: [ˈrɑu̯ni]) is a name for a being in Finnish mythology. It has been connected to another name in runic songs, Röönikkä or Ryönikkä.

Rauni was mentioned in 1551 by Mikael Agricola in a series of lines that have been difficult to interpret. Theories range from Rauni being another name of Ukko, name of Ukko's thunder goddess wife, name of Ukko's earth mother wife Maaemä, or being a name of an entirely separate fertility deity influenced by Norse Freyr (much like Virankannos who Ryönikkä is mentioned alongside with).

== Interpretations ==
Opinion among scholars concerning the role of Rauni in Finnish mythology is varied. Some interpret Rauni as a name for the consort of Ukko, the Finnish god of thunder. Christfried Ganander listed Akka 'wife/old woman', Maaemä, and Rauni all as Ukko's wife. Early interpreters saw Agricola's description as a thunder god Ukko and a thunder goddess Rauni fighting, which resulted in thunder.

Jacob Fellman claimed that the Sámi people had a goddess called Ravdna who was Ukko's wife, childless, never gave birth, also called Akko and that rowan berries were hallowed to her. Gabriel Turville-Petre also claimed the Sámi had a god called Ravdna consort of Horagalles, that is equated with Rami. However, no other sources ever mention such a goddess. While ravdna does mean 'rowan' in a Sámi language, Sámi mythology does not know a figure that would be the spouse of the thunder god, who is also never called Ukko in Sámi. Uno Harva therefore dismissed Fellman's claim, assuming he had simply tried to find a Sámi equivalent to the Rauni from Agricola's text.

Some also identify Rauni with the rowan tree, citing the reconstructed Old Norse form *raunir 'rowan' as linguistic evidence. This is used to explain how a rowan-related goddess would be a thunder god's wife, because in Norse mythology "the rowan is Thor's saviour". Furthermore, "rowan" has been used to refer to a rainbow in Sweden and Estonia.

According to Martti Haavio, the above-mentioned theories are based on a misreading of the poem documenting Finnish pre-Christian beliefs by Agricola. Therefore, the idea that Ukko had a thunder goddess wife would also be a false interpretation. From Agricola's lines, Haavio identified a god named Rauni-ukko 'Old man Rauni' and his wife. The name Rauni seems to be loaned from the Norse god Freyr (*frauja). Thus, Agricola's line Rauni Ukon Naini would mean 'the wife of Rauni-ukko', not 'Rauni, the wife of Ukko' as many have interpreted it. He also called Rauni-ukko and his unnamed wife the Finnish equivalents to Freyr and Freyja.

In a Forest Finnish runic song, fertility god Visakanta (Virankannos) and another god called Röönikkä or Ryönikkä try to strike down a giant pig. According to Haavio, Röönikkä would come from Frön akka 'the wife of Frö', Frö being a later South Swedish dialectical name for Freyr. Harva has connected Visakanta/Virankannos/Virokannas to Freyr as well, as one of Freyr's names is veraldar god. Thus, Rauni-ukko/Visakanta and his wife would be fertility gods, and in spring, the wife started to act like an animal in heat, which made Rauni-ukko aroused and their intercourse resulted in the growing of plants ("Quin Rauni Ukon Naini härsky / jalosti Ukoi pohjasti pärsky / Se sis annoi Ilman ja Wdhen Tulon"). Haavio later added that Röönnikkä could also mean 'little Frö' or Frön ukko 'old man Frö'. If this was the case, there would be no goddess involved and the ones slaying the pig would be the equivalents of Norse Thor and Freyr.

Unto Salo agreed with Haavio on that Rauni was the epithet of Ukko himself, not his wife, but that it still meant the thunder god Ukko instead of a separate fertility god. He suggested the name Rauni could be a corruption of Latin and Greek made by Agricola to connect Ukko to Zeus Keraunios (Greek keráunios 'belonging to the thunderbolt, struck by a thunderbolt, hurling thunderbolts, bearer of lightning'; Latin cerauniae 'thunderbolts'), instead of a name used in folk tradition. In this case, Agricola's fertility-increasing description would refer to a sexual act between heavenly and terrestrial deities, like a spark while striking a thunderstone (ukonkivi 'Ukko's rock') which were vulva-shaped.

When it comes to the myth of the striking down of the Great Pig, the attempting butcher names in Karelia are typically Ukko ~ Palvanen ~ Virankannos. Some runic songs from Ingria mention Ukko and Akka, although it is not certain if "Akka" here should be understood as Ukko's wife—it is not uncommon in runic songs to pair up the words ukko ("old man") and akka ("old woman") with no relation to the thunder deity Ukko. One Forest Finn song lists the names as Visakanta and Ryönikkä, another one as ukko and Röönikkä. Harva assumed Röönikkä and Ryönikkä to have originally been Raunikka or Raunikki. "Palvanen" appears in other runic songs in reference to both Ukko and Virankannos and could be an epithet instead of a name. Kaarle Krohn thought Palvanen means "someone to be worshipped" (after the verb palvoa), while Haavio thought it means "the giver of meat" (after the verb palvata).

Karelian runosongs refer to Louhi as Raana, Raani and Ranu, while Savonian runosongs call her Runo and Rania. Kaarle Krohn believed this to come from words meaning "worn out used item; tatter; useless person". This is also the source of Elias Lönnrot's marking Rauni Pohjolan emäntä 'Rauni, Mistress of Pohjola' in his dictionary.
