= Virankannos =

Finnish fertility god

- Protector of oats, fertility
- Other names: Forest Finns: Visakanta; Kainuu: Virokannas; Karelia: Saraviisas, Tinakanta, Vierokanta, Viilokanta, Viinikanta, Virokannas, Virokannaš; Savo: Virokannas
- Gender: Male
- Ethnic group: Finns, Karelians

Equivalents
- Norse: Freyr
- Sámi: Radien-attje

Virankannos is a Finnish fertility god. He was first mentioned in writing by Mikael Agricola in the preamble of his 1551 Finnish translation of the Book of Psalms as a protector of oats (Wirancannos Cauran caitzi).

== Name ==
Virankannos is known by many other variations of his name, such as Virokannas, Visakanta, Vierokanta and Viinikanta.

Elias Lönnrot theorized the name would mean 'of Estonian origin' (Viron kantaa). Jacob Fellman assumed it came from virka 'trap' but this would be more fitting if Virankannos was a hunting god instead of that of oats. Kaarle Krohn theorized the name would be a reference to a Roman Catholic saint. According to Uno Harva and Eemil Nestor Setälä, vira and later viro in this name would mean 'world', loaned from Germanic languages. In this case, Virankannos would mean 'the one who holds up the world'. The -kanta and -kannos would mean a pillar, evoking phallic imagery.

Virankannos has thus been connected to the Sámi god Veralden Radien, who supports the pillar which holds up the sky, as well as the Norse fertility god Freyr (also called veraldar god). Instead of specifically protecting oats, he'd be a general god in the sky on par with Ukko, ensuring the growing of crops. Martti Haavio did not agree with this, arguing that Virankannos would come from Virok-annos, from wîhrôk 'incense' and Johannes (John the Evangelist). Anna-Leena Siikala supported Setälä and Harva's theory, as oats are not a very old type of crops in Finland and are called with a Germanic loanword kaura. She therefore considers Virankannos a general fertility deity like Freyr, instead of only oats.

Siikala further connected Virankannos to Antero Vipunen, who is also called Viroinen in runic songs, as Vipunen's son Lemminkäinen is sometimes connected to fire, the sun, and fertility. Setälä stated that the mysterious Vironvipu in Ingrian runic songs means the same as Virankannos: the world pillar. He guessed Vipunen's original first name could've been closest to the form Kanderva instead of Antero, related to the words kanta, kannas 'base, narrow connecting part, footboard'.

When mentioned in runic songs, he is also called Ukko 'old man', even Ukko, the High God. Another name, possibly an epithet, which is paired with both Ukko and versions of Virankannos, is Palvanen or Palvonen. The name Palvanen is theorized to mean either "someone to be worshipped" (after palvoa 'to worship') or "the giver of meat" (after palvata 'to cure meat by roasting and smoking it slowly in relatively mild heat').

== In runic songs ==
In the Finnish and Karelian runic song The Great Ox (Finnish: Iso härkä), a giant ox emerges and must be killed by someone. Virokannas attempts to strike it down, but the ox simply swung its head, causing Virokannas to fly into a tree. In a Forest Finnish version, the animal is a giant pig instead and Virokannas is called Visakanta. The Forest Finnish version also mentions another god involved in the slaying attempt, Röönnikkä or Ryönikkä. According to Haavio, the name Röönnikkä would come from Frön akka 'the wife of Frö', Frö being a later South Swedish dialectical name for Freyr. Röönnikkä has been connected to the mysterious Rauni: Harva assumed Röönnikkä and Ryönikkä to have originally been Raunikka or Raunikki. Haavio later added that Röönnikkä could also mean 'little Frö' or Frön ukko 'old man Frö'. If this was the case, there would be no goddess involved and the ones slaying the pig would be the equivalents of Norse Thor and Freyr.

There is also a Karelian song Judgement of Väinämöinen (Finnish: Väinämöisen tuomio) in which Virokannas is called a foreigner who appears to baptize a child Väinämöinen rejected and announces the child to be the King of Pohjola or Karelia, depending on the version. In a Ladoga Karelian song of Maiden Iro, Iro becomes pregnant from eating a lingonberry and gives birth to triplets. Ukko and Virankannos are equated when Iro asks Ukko, High God, Viinikanta to baptize her children who he then names Väinämöinen, Ilmarinen and Joukahainen.

== In the Kalevala ==
Virokannas appears in the runes 20 and 50 in the Kalevala by Elias Lönnrot, where he is also called ukko and Palvoinen. In rune 20, he attempts to slay the great ox but fails. In rune 50, he arrives to baptize a child given birth to by Marjatta, who became pregnant from eating a lingonberry, but demands the child to be examined and judged first. Väinämöinen sentences the fatherless child to death, but the child reminds Väinämöinen of his own wrongdoings. After this, Virokannas baptizes the child as King of Karelia.
