= Sipi Antinpoika =

Sipi Antinpoika (died 1662), was a Finnish Pagan practitioner, who was executed for witchcraft after having performed a Pagan ritual.

He was reported to the authorities by the parish vicars of Hauho, Tuulos and Lammi in Kanta-Häme, for having enticed their congregations to participate in a ritual to the Finnish fertility god Ukko, in which he officiated. He had entered a lake naked and raised a ritual toast to the god, begging Ukko for rain to ensure fertility in a period of drought. Some of the villagers revealed the ritual to the clergy, who in turn reported the matter. These Pagan rituals were in fact not uncommon in Finland, but in the 17th century, the authorities discontinued their previous policy of tolerating in silence and in order to persecute them, and the church wished to make examples of the leaders of these rituals. The witchcraft act was used to condemn Sipi Antinpoika to death for committing idolatry be worshiping pagan gods.
