= 8034 Akka =

Near-Earth asteroid

Discovery
- Discovered by: C. Shoemaker; E. Shoemaker
- Discovery site: Palomar Obs.
- Discovery date: 3 June 1992

Designations
- Named after: Akka (Finnish mythology)
- Alternative designations: 1992 LR
- Minor planet category: Amor; NEO

Orbital characteristics
- Epoch 4 September 2017 (JD 2458000.5)
- Uncertainty parameter 0
- Observation arc: 23.78 yr (8,687 days)
- Aphelion: 2.5787 AU
- Perihelion: 1.0817 AU
- Semi-major axis: 1.8302 AU
- Eccentricity: 0.4090
- Orbital period (sidereal): 2.48 yr (904 days)
- Mean anomaly: 49.897°
- Mean motion: 0° 23^{m} 53.16^{s} / day
- Inclination: 2.0241°
- Longitude of ascending node: 232.87°
- Argument of perihelion: 68.173°
- Earth MOID: 0.0742 AU (28.9 LD)

Physical characteristics
- Dimensions: 0.540±0.260 km; 0.700 km (derived); 0.800 km
- Synodic rotation period: 3.6377 h; 7.283±0.004 h
- Geometric albedo: 0.20 (assumed); 0.33±0.23
- Spectral type: S
- Absolute magnitude (H): 17.9; 18.14; 18.148±0.11; 18.15±0.11; 18.16±0.22

8034 Akka, provisional designation 1992 LR, is a sub-kilometer sized, eccentric asteroid and near-Earth object of the Apollo group, approximately 540 meters in diameter. It was discovered at Palomar Observatory in 1992, and named after Akka from Finnish mythology.

== Discovery ==
Akka was discovered by American astronomer couple Carolyn and Eugene Shoemaker at the Palomar Observatory, California, on 3 June 1992. The discovery was made as the asteroid neared a close approach to Earth the following month at 12.1 million kilometers or 31.5 lunar distances (LD).

== Orbit and classification ==
Akka orbits the Sun at a distance of 1.1–2.6 AU once every 2 years and 6 months (904 days). Its orbit has an eccentricity of 0.41 and an inclination of 2° with respect to the ecliptic. The first observation was made at Siding Spring Observatory in May 1992, extending the asteroid's observation arc by just two weeks prior to its discovery.

=== Close approaches ===
With an Earth minimum orbit intersection distance of 0.0742 AU (11,100,000 km) or 28.9 LD, Akka is only slightly above the threshold-limit of 0.05 AU, or about 19.5 lunar distances, defined for potentially hazardous asteroids.

Akka frequently makes close approaches to Earth and Mars. Its closest recorded approach to Earth and Mars is 0.081 AU on 29 July 1992 and 0.061 AU on 26 April 1982, respectively. It will make its closest approach to another planet when it comes within 0.044 AU of Mars on 6 April 2171.

== Physical characteristics ==
=== Rotation period ===
A rotational lightcurve of Akka was obtained from photoelectric observation made by Polish astronomer Wiesław Wiśniewski of the University of Arizona in August 1992. The ambiguous lightcurve gave a rotation period of 7.283±0.004 hours with a brightness variation of 0.46 in magnitude (U=2). Alternatively, the body rotates once every 3.6377 hours (or half the previous period) with an amplitude of 0.52, as determined by Czech astronomer Petr Pravec (U=2).

=== Diameter and albedo ===
According to Spitzer's "NEOSurvey", a follow-up to the "ExploreNEOs" program, Akka measures 0.540 kilometers in diameter and its surface has a high albedo of 0.33. The Collaborative Asteroid Lightcurve Link assumes a standard albedo for stony asteroids of 0.20 and calculates a diameter of 0.7 kilometers with an absolute magnitude of 18.148.

== Naming ==
This minor planet was named after Akka from Finnish mythology. She is the Earth's mother and the goddess of harvest and personifies love, agriculture and femininity. Akka is the wife of the principal sky deity Ukko, after whom the minor planet 2020 Ukko is named. The official naming citation was published by the Minor Planet Center on 24 July 2002 (M.P.C. 46101).
