= Temmes =

- Former municipality
- Temmeksen kunta Temmes kommun
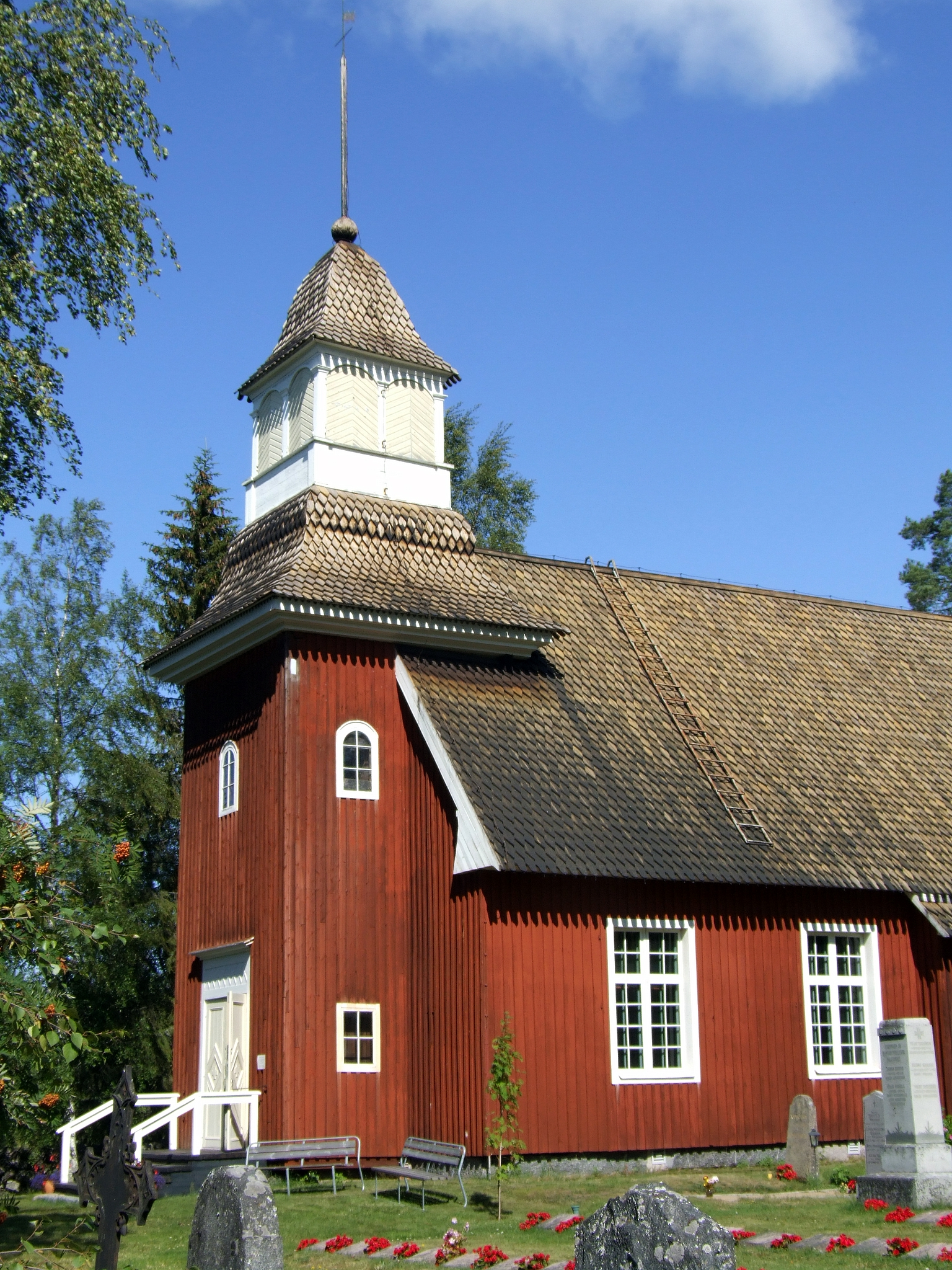
- Temmes Church (1767), designed and built by Antti Louet.

- Coat of arms

- Location of Temmes in Finland
- Coordinates: 64°40′N 025°36′E
- Country: Finland
- Region: Northern Ostrobothnia
- Sub-region: Lakeus sub-region
- Charter: 1899
- Consolidated: 2001

Area
  - Land: 116 km^{2} (45 sq mi)

Population (2000)
  - Total: 700
  - Density: 6.0/km^{2} (16/sq mi)
- Time zone: UTC+2 (EET)
  - Summer (DST): UTC+3 (EEST)

Temmes is a former municipality in Northern Ostrobothnia in central western Finland. In 2000, the area had a population of 700. It is the birthplace of the renowned Finnish folklorist and poet Martti Haavio. Since 2001, most parts of the area have been part of the municipality of Tyrnävä. Separate enclaves were merged to Liminka, Lumijoki and Rantsila. Villages in the area include Haapakylä, Haurukylä, Kärsämä, Temmes and Ylipää.

== History ==
The Temmes area has had inhabitants since the Stone Age, when the area bordered an ocean. Population in the area became steady in the 14th century and the number of inhabitants increased in the 1550s, when Gustav I of Sweden ordered the wilderness to be populated. Settlement advanced by the Temmesjoki river. During the Greater Wrath, Temmes area was largely destroyed. During the Middle Ages and the beginning of modern times, the main trade was fishing. Agriculture began in the 18th century.
