= Ukko (island) =

Island on Lake Inari in Inari, Finland

Coordinates: 68°56′19.6″N 27°17′32.3″E

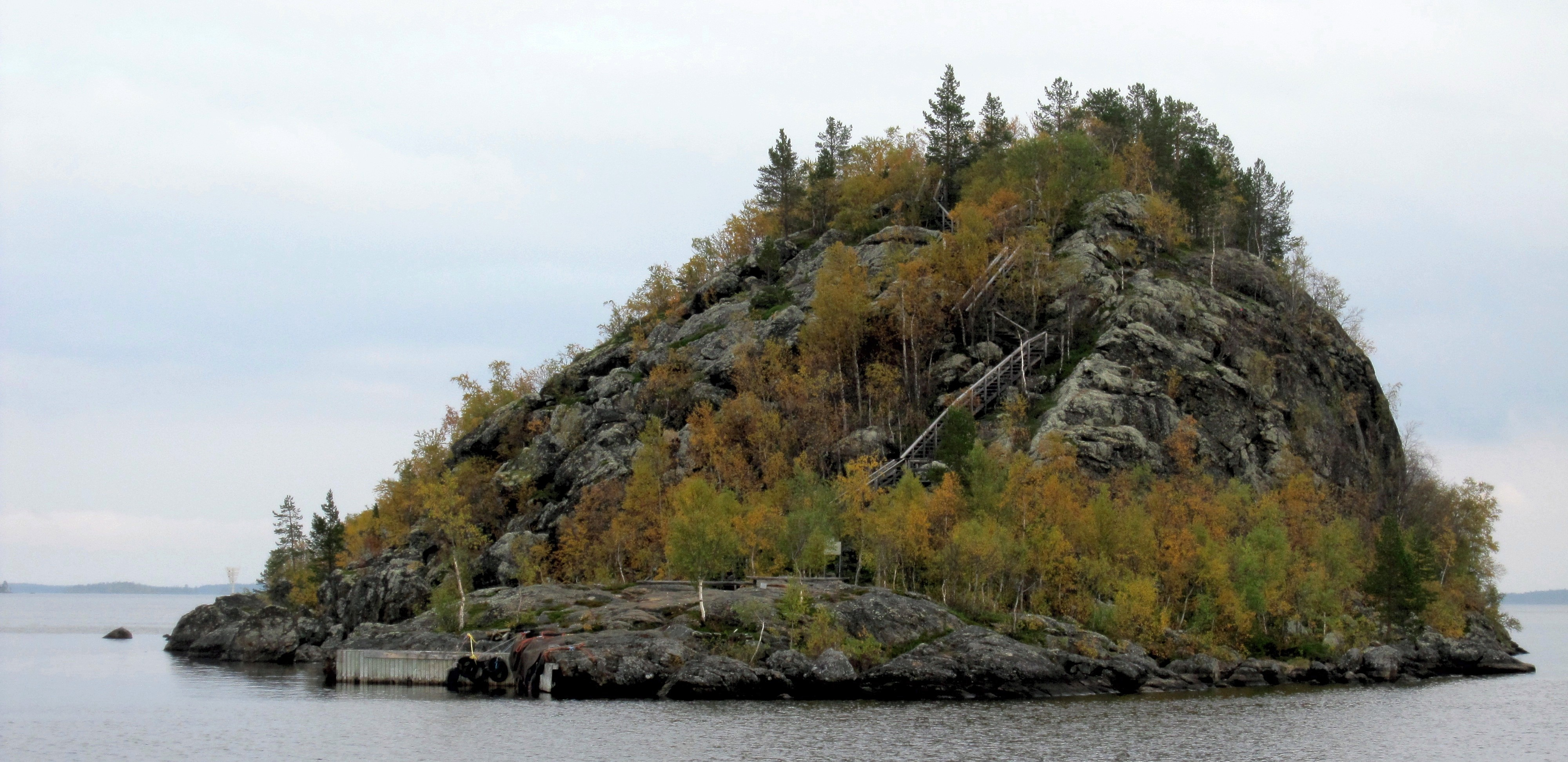

Ukko (Inari Sami: Äijih) (Note: Also known as Ukonsaari or Ukonkivi (Finnish), Äijihsuálui or Äijihkeđgi (Inari Sámi); Northern Sami: Ádjásuolu) is an island in Lake Inari, Finnish Lapland. The area of the lake is called Ukonselkä. Ukko was considered by the local Inari Sámi to be an extremely important sieidi (Inari Sami: siejdi, Finnish: seita), or sacred natural formation, and was used as a sacrificial site, perhaps as recently as in the 19th century. The names "Ukko" and "Äijih" refer to sky deities in the Finnish and Sámi mythologies, respectively.

The island is about 30 metres (98 feet) high, 50 metres (160 feet) broad and a 100 metres (330 feet) long. The distance from the village of Inari to Ukko is approximately 11 kilometres (6.8 miles). There are guided tours to the site during the summer from the harbour of the Sámi museum, Siida.

There are two known siedis at Ukonsaari. The first one to be studied was a sacrificial cave. One of the most important archaeological findings in Lapland was made at Ukko in 1873 by the British archaeologist Sir Arthur Evans, when a silver jewellery fragment was found in the cave. An additional siedi was discovered in 2007 by Finnish archaeologists.

The names of some of the numerous islands adjacent to Ukonsaari may suggest other religious sites, for example:

- Palo Ukko (Finnish: Fire-Ukko)
- Pikku Ukko (Little Ukko)
- Ukonkarit (Ukko's skerries, a series of islets close to Ukonsaari)
- Hautuumaasaari (Burial ground island)
- Aviosaaret (Marriage islands)
- Tissikivisaari (Breast-stone island)
- Vanha hautuumaasaari (Old burial ground island)
- Ristisalmensaaret (Cross sound islands)

== See also ==
- Ukko
- Horagalles
- Tiermes
- Sámi religion
