= Peijaiset =

Finnish funeral ritual for hunted animals

Peijaiset (in dialectal forms peijahaiset, peijaat or peijaajaiset) is a Finnish concept, dating to pre-Christian times, denoting a memorial feast (akin to a wake) that was held to honour a slain animal, particularly the bear, the animal most sacred to ancient Finns. In modern-day usage, it often refers to the celebrations following a successful elk hunt, or a feast at the end of a hunting season. It may also be used in a figurative sense, denoting any memorial held for things that have come to an end ("peijaiset" over e.g. bankrupt companies). Traditionally, it referred to wakes for humans and animals, but also other celebrations, depending on the region in question.

Karhunpeijaiset (lit. a bear wake) is a celebration held for the soul of a slain bear after a successful bear hunt. Traditionally, a bear was never "hunted" but was merely "brought down". A single man could claim to have hunted and killed a bear, but when the entire community was involved, the bear was simply said to have died. The bear's spirit had to be told that it had fallen into a pit or that it had otherwise killed itself by accident, not by the hunters, to appease the bear's spirit so that it would not be offended, and possibly exact revenge upon the hunters. The ceremony was always a much more elaborate affair than what the most influential member of the community would have merited. In eastern Finland, it would have copious mourners and wailers, and the people would address the bear as a relative, or the son of a god. Its flesh was not eaten, which would have been cannibalism, or, if it was, an elaborate show was made to symbolically render the meat into that of another animal such as venison. The bear's head was usually mounted on the top of a young tree, or on a pike, so as to help the bear's spirit climb up into the stars (specifically, the constellation of the Great Bear), where it was believed bears' souls had come from. Carrion-eaters would then eat it, leaving only the skull, which would then become an object of veneration. A courtyard would also be cleared around the skull. Traditionally, only bears were honoured thus.

Sometimes, the ceremony was performed in the fashion of a sacred marriage rather than a wake. In such cases, the bear was either propped up inside of a frame or strapped to a cross. With all due ceremony, the chosen bride or groom would symbolically marry the bear.

In the present day, peijaiset usually refers to a celebration at the end of a successful hunt or the end of a hunting season, and they are usually only held for moose and bears. On many occasions, it involves a festive evening meal for the hunters, made from the latest kill.

Similar customs have been reported from many other northern people who share their habitat with bears.

== See also ==
- Iomante, a similar practice among the Ainu people of Japan.
- Vakkajuhlat, a sacred festival celebrated in Finland in honour of the god Ukko.
