= Karsikko =

Blockade for a dead person's spirit

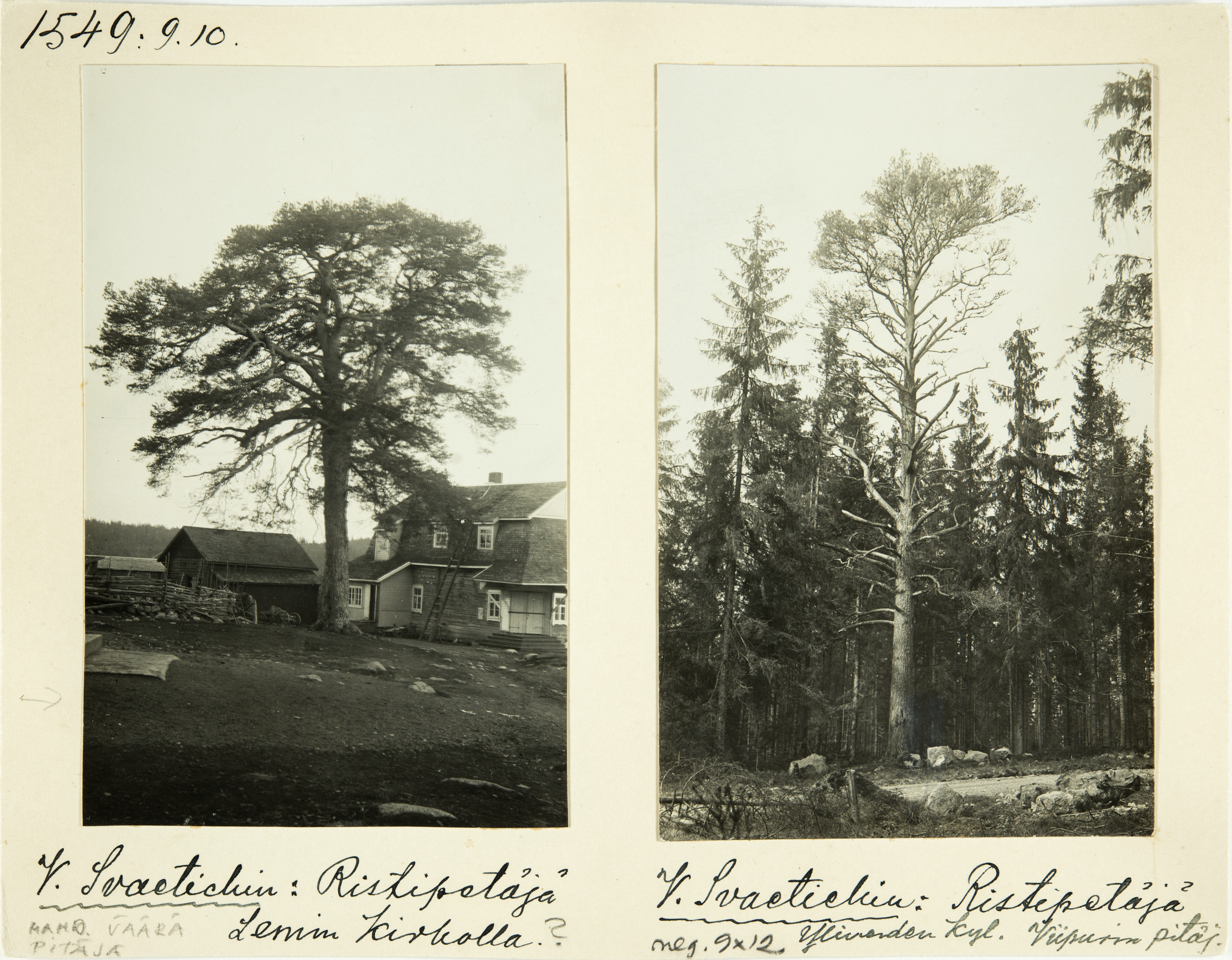
Karsikko in Lemi church

In the Finnic religion, a karsikko was a set of markings made on a tree somewhere between a deceased person's home and the burial site, which was believed to prevent the individual's spirit from coming back.
