= Lule Sámi people =

Sámi ethno-linguistic group

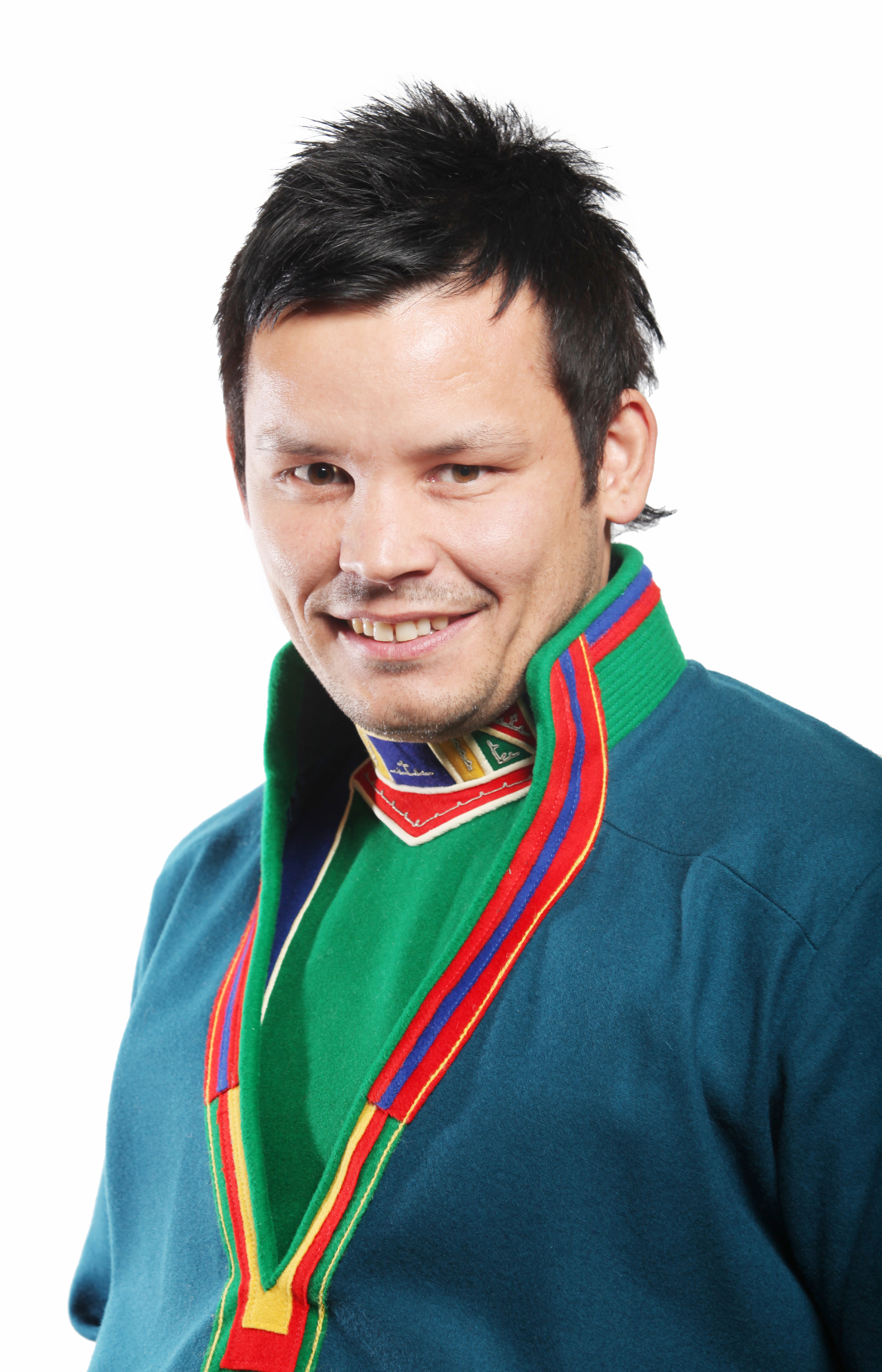
Lule Sámi politician Lars Filip Paulsen in traditional Lule Sámi clothing (gáppte).

Lule Sámi people (Lule Sámi: julevsáme) are a group of Sámi people in Sweden and Norway who speak the Lule Sámi language. In Sweden, they traditionally live in Jokkmokk, Gällivare and Northern Arjeplog, and in Norway, in Northern Salten. Named after the Lule River (Julevädno) in Sweden, the term "Luleå Lapper" was first used by Johannes Tornæus in 1653.

Traditional Lule Sámi clothing is called gáppte. In 1994, the Lule Sámi center Árran was founded in Drag (Ájluokta), Hamarøy (Hábmer).

== Language ==
The estimated number of Lule Sámi speakers is around 650 individuals but there are Lule Sámi people who don't know the language. According to a survey, approximately 40% of Lule Sámi surveyed between ages 18 and 30 believe it comes naturally to them to speak, read and write in Lule Sámi.
