= Piru (spirit) =

Fiend or demon in Finnish mythology

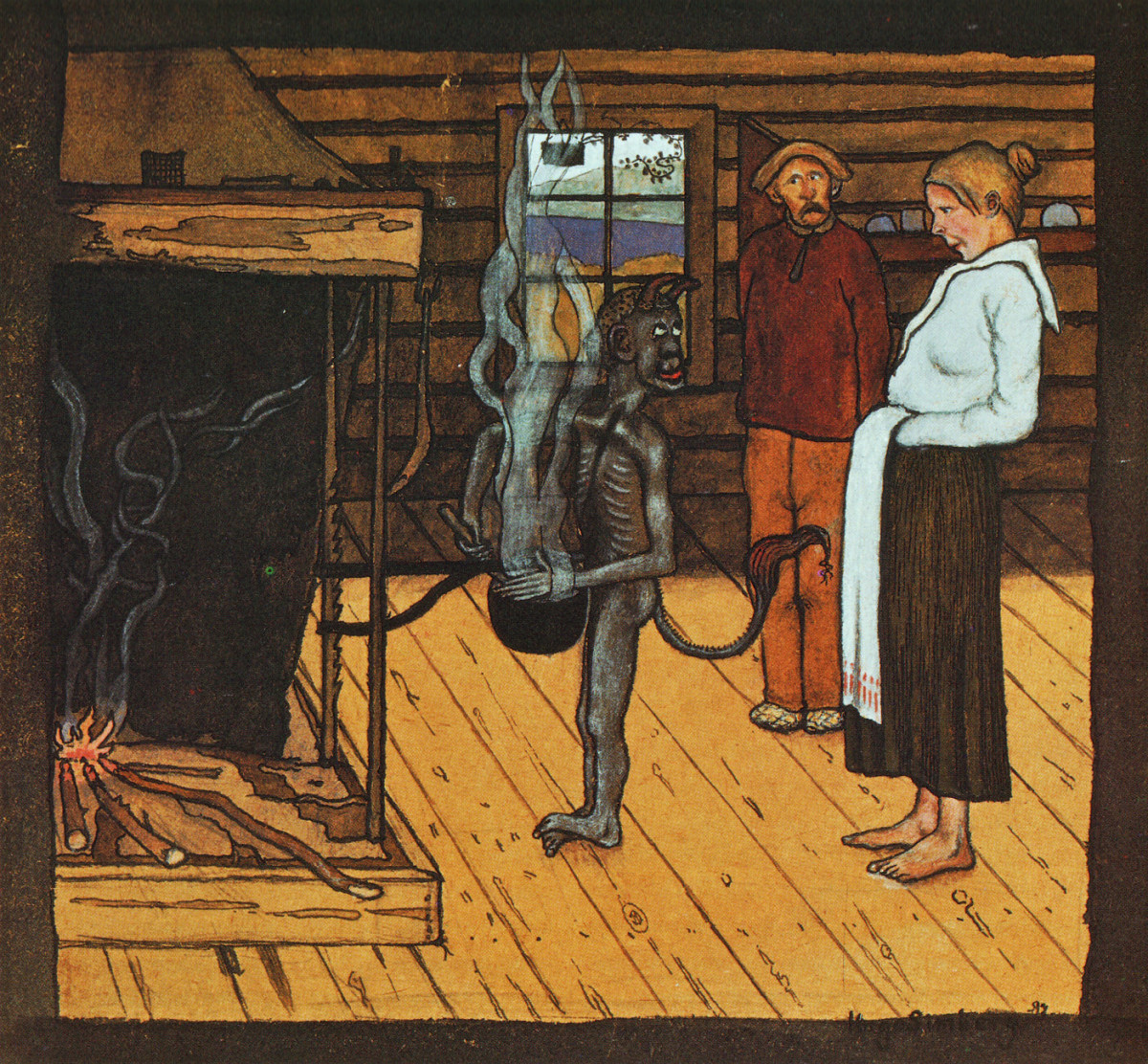
The Poor Devil by the Fire / The Devil by the Pot (1897) by Hugo Simberg

A piru is a fiend or demon in Finnish mythology. The word is inherited from Proto-Finnic *piru* ‘devil, demon’, with cognates in Karelian, Ingrian and Estonian; its ultimate origin is unknown.

In folklore, a piru is often featured as a nasty spirit of the forest with which a smart aleck either wins or loses a battle of wits, giving or receiving a forfeit in return. In many cases, poltergeist and haunting phenomena are described as "pirus". The Devil may be referred to as (proper noun) Piru, or Pääpiru, the main piru.

"Piru" is also a mild swearword in Finnish.
