= Ukko =

God of the sky, weather, harvest and thunder in Finnish mythology

- God of thunder and weather
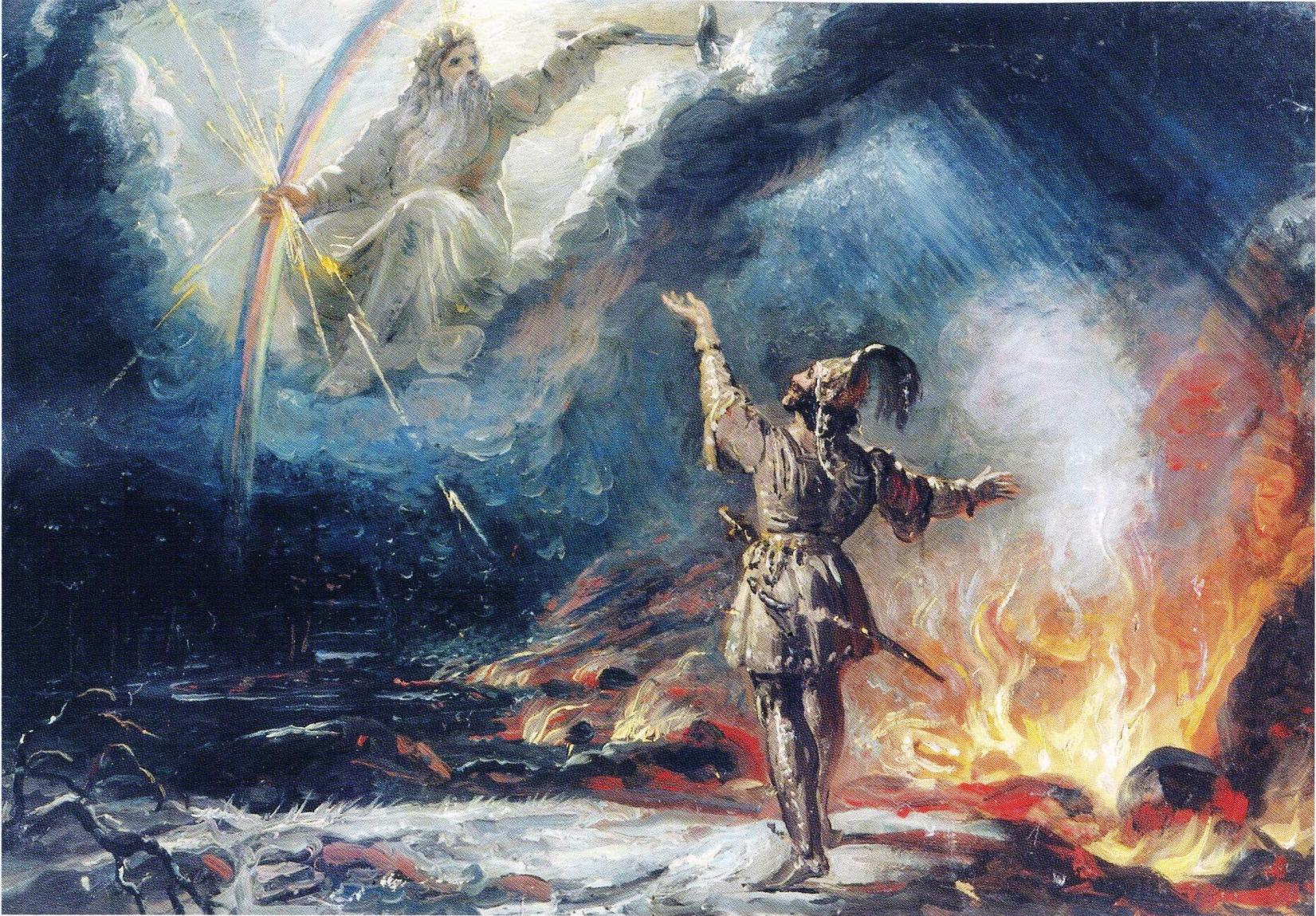
- Painting by Robert Ekman in 1867 called Lemminkäinen tulisella järvellä where Lemminkäinen asks help from Ukko ylijumala with crossing the lake in fire on his route to the wedding at Pohjola.
- Abode: Sky
- Weapon: Hammer, sword or axe
- Symbol: Rowan tree, great mullein
- Festivals: Vakkajuhlat
- Consort: Assumed Maaemä

Equivalents
- Norse: Thor
- Baltic: Perkūnas
- Sámi: Horagalles

Ukko (Finnish: [ˈukːo]), is a thunder and weather god in Finnish mythology, whose vital role is fertilizing fields with his thunder and rain.

Unto Salo believes that Ilmari, the Finnic sky god, is the origin of Ukko, but that as Ukko Ilmari experienced very significant, although far from total, influence from the Indo-European sky god especially in the form of Thor. Eemil Nestor Setälä also stated that Ukko can't be a very old name for a god and that the thunder god cult among Finns was of Germanic origin. According to Martti Haavio, the name Ukko was sometimes used as a common noun or generalised epithet for multiple deities instead of denoting a specific god. In 1789, Christfried Ganander wrote that the forest god Tapio was sometimes honoured with the name Ukko.

Ukko is parallel to Uku in Estonian mythology, but it is highly debated if such god was ever worshipped in Estonia. According to the Etymological Dictionary of the Finnish Language, the word was loaned into Estonian from Finnish and the first to use it in the sense of a high god was Friedrich Reinhold Kreutzwald in the 1830s. Kaarle Krohn believed Kreutzwald had confused the Finnish Ukon vakka and Ingrian Ukko vak, a sacrifice to Ukko, with the Estonian Tõnni vak, a sacrifice to the household spirit. There has also been a mention of sacrificial stones in Estonia called Ukko's stones. According to Oskar Loorits, Kreutzwald had copied "high god Uku" from Finnish Christfried Ganander, but the Ukko cult had many Scandinavian features which had also spread to the coasts of Virumaa, Estonia.

== Name ==
Ukkonen, the Finnish word for thunder, is the diminutive form of the name Ukko. (Note: Compare to thunder (Old English: þunor) and German: donner (Old High German: donar) both derived from Proto-Germanic *þunraz and originally synonymic with appellations of the thunder god.) (Note: In Finnish, diminutive formations do not carry the same pejorative or belittling connotations they do in some other languages, for example Latin.) Ukko is Finnish for 'male grandparent', 'grandfather', and 'old man'.

According to Matthias Castrén, Ukko as the name of a god can't be very old, or at least not the oldest, because it does not exist in a wider Finno-Ugric area apart from Finland, Estonia and, in a slightly modified form, Lapland. The mainly western word Äijä (Finnish: [ˈæi̯jæ]), which has the same meaning as the word ukko, could also be connected to a thunder god: In Uusimaa, äijä jyrittää (lit. 'old man is rumbling') has meant thunder. Salo and Uno Harva have also pointed out the Estonian terms äiä hoog 'thunder rain' and äikene 'thunder'. Thunder is also connected to a "grandfather" in Selkup, languages with a distant relation to Finnish, where thunder can be called iĺč́a totta (lit. 'grandfather is cursing'). Sometimes iĺč́a (lit. 'grandfather') is replaced with Nom (lit. 'god, sky'): numi̬t č́ari̬ (lit. 'voice of Num/sound of the sky'). Similar meaning is found from some of the names of the Sámi thunder god: Aija, Aije, or Aijeke.

In runic songs, Ukko is also given the epithet ylijumala (lit. 'High God'), which earlier writers have understood meaning Ukko's role as the supreme god and ruler of other gods. Julius Krohn emphasised that Ukko was not the leader of other gods, stating that this hierarchy had been created by Elias Lönnrot. According to Haavio, this epithet refers to Ukko's location: on high in the sky. Haavio also brought up the name Remu which appears in runic songs, suggesting it to be a loan from Slavic languages (compare to Russian and Old Slavonic grom 'thunder'). The name Tuuri appeared in Western Finland for a thunder god, loaned from Thor. Same might appear in a runic song from White Karelia.

Other names for Ukko include Pitkänen (pitkä, 'long'), Isäinen (isä, 'father'), Isoinen (iso, archaic form of the above, modern meaning 'great', 'big' or 'large'). These could be euphemisms, as Jacob Fellman wrote the Sámi didn't dare to utter the name of their thunder god when it was thundering, and the same could've been true for Finns. Forest Finns used the euphemisms ylkäinen and ylikäinen, meaning something or someone who is above. A similar meaning for the name of a thunder god exists among the Sámi as Pajonn, which might also be loaned as Pajainen in Savo.

A runic song from South Ostrobothnia mentions Pitkämöönen striking fire. In the same context, another runic song from South Ostrobothnia mentions Väinämöinen in this part, and a runic song from Kainuu mentions Väinämöinen and Ilmarinen (Ilman rinta).

== Origins ==
In 1782, Christian Erici Lencqvist said Ukko seemed to have been the chief god of Finland, which was later repeated by Lönnrot and Castrén. Julius Krohn opposed this view. Kaarle Krohn called Ukko a thunder god who had received features of a Christian protector of everything. Ukko's thunder and refreshing rain were vital for the growth of crops, but he was also asked to help in various kinds of situations, such as labour, weddings, healing the sick, setting cattle on the fields and slaughtering them, hunting, fishing, when in court, etcetera. At this point, Ukko had become a ruler of the sky with features of the Christian God. While making the Kalevala, Lönnrot wanted to emphasise the supposed "good" proto-monotheistic nature of Finnish paganism and began to systemically refer to Ukko as the supreme god.

Ukko likely developed from Baltic influence which reached Finland with the Corded Ware culture. Later, he was influenced by the Scandinavian thunder god, Thor. Ukko shares many similarities with Thor as a club or sword wielding ruler of storms and lightning. According to Anna-Leena Siikala, Ukko's importance grew due to the rise of slash-and-burn agriculture, which resulted in the Vakkajuhlat ritual beer festival which was held until the 19th century. This beer festival also had its Baltic equivalents.

According to Salo, Ukko and Ilmarinen are from their roots the same Indo-European human formed thunder god. Examples of a personified thunder or thunder god can be found among both Finno-Ugrics and Indo-Europeans. The one who strikes fire in the origin of fire runic song, and is therefore the lord of the thunderstorm, is typically called Ilmarinen or Ilman ukko 'old man of the sky' by forging with eagle (kokko) feathers. While Harva thought Ilmarinen is the primary figure of this position, it alone is not sufficient to categorize Ilmarinen as a true thunder god. On the other hand, Frog wrote that that the sky god and thunder god likely used to be the same: Ilmari. Siikala thought Ilman ukko was thunder itself, and Ilmarinen would've taken over its role in the song in inland Finland to emphasise the differences between fire, water (Väinämöinen) and air (Ilmarinen). In Latvian mythology, the sky smith (Debess kalējs) or a parallel figure of the thunder god or sky god forges so that coals fall into the sea or the river Daugava. Though Ukko gained the role of a controller of rain and weather for the purposes of agriculture, Ilmarinen kept a role as a wind god.

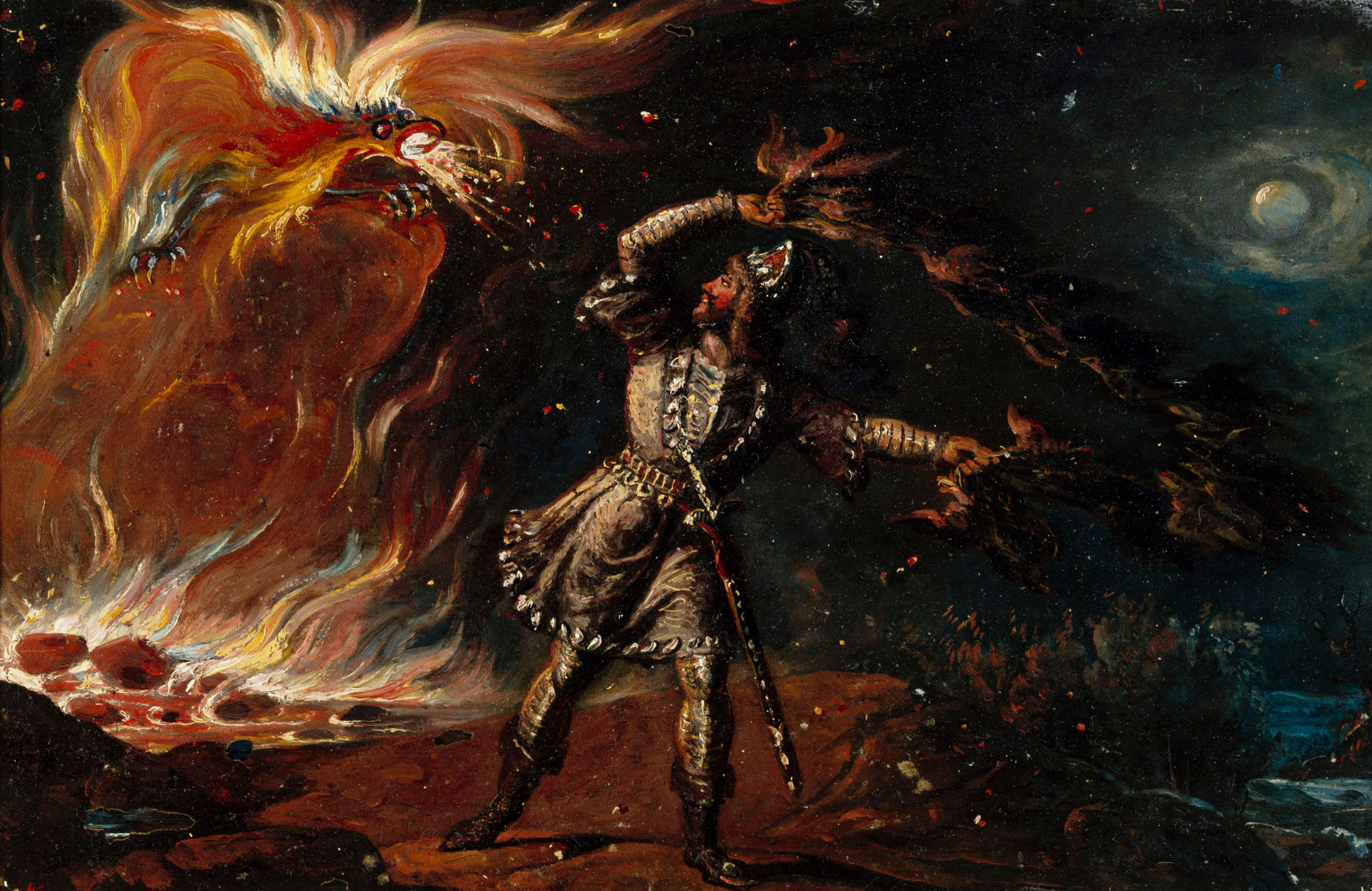
The fire spewing eagle kokko was thought to be the thunderbird, the cause of thunder, prior to the development of the idea of a human-form thunder deity. Lemminkäinen and the Fiery Eagle, Robert Wilhelm Ekman (1867).

Prior to a human-form thunder deity, it seems that Finns believed thunder to be caused by the thunder eagle. Echoes of this can still be seen with Ilmarinen forging with eagle feathers. In a runic song from Kuusamo, a spark of fire is born when an eagle's claws hit a rock. This eagle or bird from Pohjola is also able to spit fire, further confirming the thunderbird imagery. Forest Finns believed the eagle to be Ukko's helper, who drove away Ukko and Väinämöinen's enemy, Loho. Loho travelled in a raven-form, bringing wolves with her to devour cattle. To please Ukko, and to keep Loho away, Forest Finns kept a woodgrouse's wing on an altar shelf (lykkylauta).

Although portrayed active in myth, when appealed to Ukko makes all his appearances in legend solely by natural phenomena.

== Finnish folklore ==
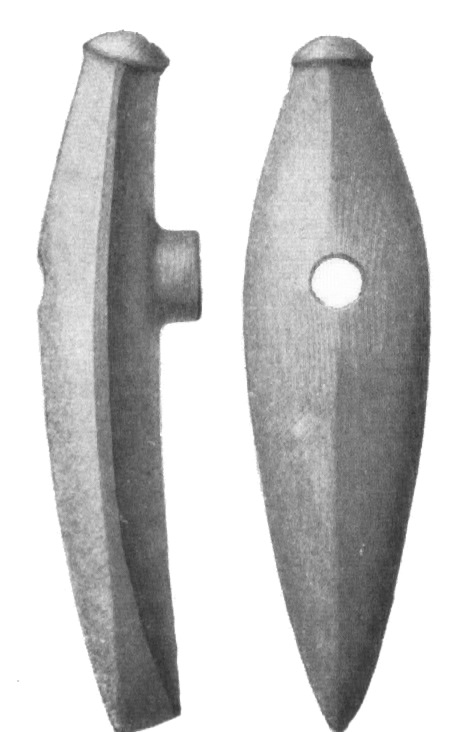
Corded Ware culture boat-shaped battle axe from Närke, Sweden.

Pre-Christian pendants associated with thunder gods. A Finnish type, B Swedish type, C Wolf's cross.

Oldest mentions of Ukko were by Mikael Agricola in 1551, who described the Ukon vakka festival. It is unclear what he meant by the lines Quin Rauni Ukon Naini härsky / jalosti Ukoi pohjasti pärsky / Se sis annoi Ilman ja Wdhen Tulon. Early interpreters understood this as a description of thunder god Ukko fighting with his wife, thunder goddess Rauni, which would've then resulted in thunder. Christfried Ganander connected this "Ukko's wife Rauni" to Maaemä (lit. 'earth mother'; also called Akka lit. 'old woman'). Haavio disagreed with this, stating that the text written by Agricola which has been used to justify this interpretation is a misunderstanding. He argued that Agricola's text mentioned two completely different gods, a fertility god Rauni-ukko and his unnamed wife ("wife of Rauni-ukko"), whose copulation would result in fertile fields. According to Haavio, the name Rauni would be a loan and have the same origin as the name Freyr, and the copulation of Rauni-ukko and his wife would be inspired by the Scandinavian story of intercourse between Freyr and Freyja. Salo agreed with Haavio on that Rauni was the epithet of Ukko himself, not his wife, but that it still meant the thunder god Ukko instead of a separate fertility god. He suggested the name Rauni could be a corruption of Latin and Greek made by Agricola to connect Ukko to Zeus Keraunios (Greek keráunios 'belonging to the thunderbolt, struck by a thunderbolt, hurling thunderbolts, bearer of lightning'; Latin cerauniae 'thunderbolts'), instead of a name used in folk tradition. In this case, Agricola's fertility-increasing description would refer to a sexual act between heavenly and terrestrial deities, like a spark while striking a thunderstone (ukonkivi 'Ukko's rock') which were vulva-shaped.

Rainbow has been called ukonkaari 'Ukko's arch'. The rowan tree was sacred to Finns, and in Norse mythology, they were sacred to Thor as it was said that the rowan is Thor's saviour: He was able to get out of the Vimur River by grabbing onto a rowan. Swedes thought of the rainbow as a rowan tree, and this belief spread to Estonia as well. Because the name Rauni sounds like Old Norse reynir 'rowan', a connection made by Setälä, later writers have called rowan a tree sacred to Ukko. According to Kaarle Krohn, as Scandinavians thought the rowan was sacred to Thor, this belief could've spread to Finland. In runic songs, the rowan tree appears as a sacred tree in wedding songs, the rowan's branches full of berries symbolizing a pregnant woman. Rowan berries were also used for different kinds of healing and protection spells. Evil spirits and demons were thought to be afraid of the rowan.

The "old man in the sky" was also believed to cause thunderstorms by driving his chariot through the skies. Other possible causes of thunder include the rolling of stones or grinding, and there is even a set of verses describing Ukko "threshing in a cabin of fire".

Ukko possessed a weapon, often called Ukon naula 'Ukko's nail' or Ukon vaaja, meaning a thunderstone (Neolithic stone tools such as battle axes). In spirit with the idea that thunder was originally the thunder eagle for Finns, thunderstones are also called Ukonkynsi 'Ukko's claw', claws made of stone. He also possessed a fiery arrow, Ukon nuoli 'Ukko's arrow', and a fiery bow. Runic songs mention him having a golden axe, a golden club, a hammer (Ukonvasara) and a sword. To be noted is that the word for hammer, vasara, originally meant a stone age battle axe. Uno Harva compared Ukko's vaaja to vajrapani held by the Hindu god Indra. Ukko's hammer made of metal is comparable to Thor's weapon Mjölnir, and pendants similar to those of Mjölnir have been unearthed in Finland. Ukko fights against evil beings, be it demons or trolls. Similar beliefs have been recorded from Estonia, as during thunder, God is thought to strike evil spirits or Vanapagan.

The ladybird was also considered sacred to Ukko and called ukonlehmä 'Ukko's cow'. The Finnish name of the great mullein (Verbascum thapsus) is ukontulikukka (lit. 'Ukko's fire flower'), possibly named after Ukko.

== Festivals dedicated to Ukko ==
Before the advent of Christianity, the Midsummer festival in Finland, today known as Juhannus after John the Baptist (Finnish: Johannes Kastaja), was held in honor of Ukko and called Ukon juhla (Festival of Ukko). This tradition carried to the 19th century.

Also dedicated to Ukko were the Vakkajuhlat (Vakka festival) also known as Ukon vakat (Ukko's vakkas) or simply vakat (Vakkas). Vakkas were commonly held in May coinciding with the spring sowing. During Vakkas it was customary to consume or otherwise offer a container or some other vessel (Finnish: vakka) of an alcoholic beverage or food as sacrifice. It appears that often the festival was held in the community's sacred grove or hiisi where an animal sacrifice was sometimes also performed as part of the same festival. This ceremony was believed to guarantee good weather for the coming year and thus a good harvest.

It appears that the vakka tradition was rather lively. The last uncontested reports of Vakkas being held originate in the 19th century, although sporadic reports also surface in the 20th century. The festival is also mentioned by the Finnish reformer Mikael Agricola in his account of what from his point of view was Finnish idolatry.

== Eponymy ==
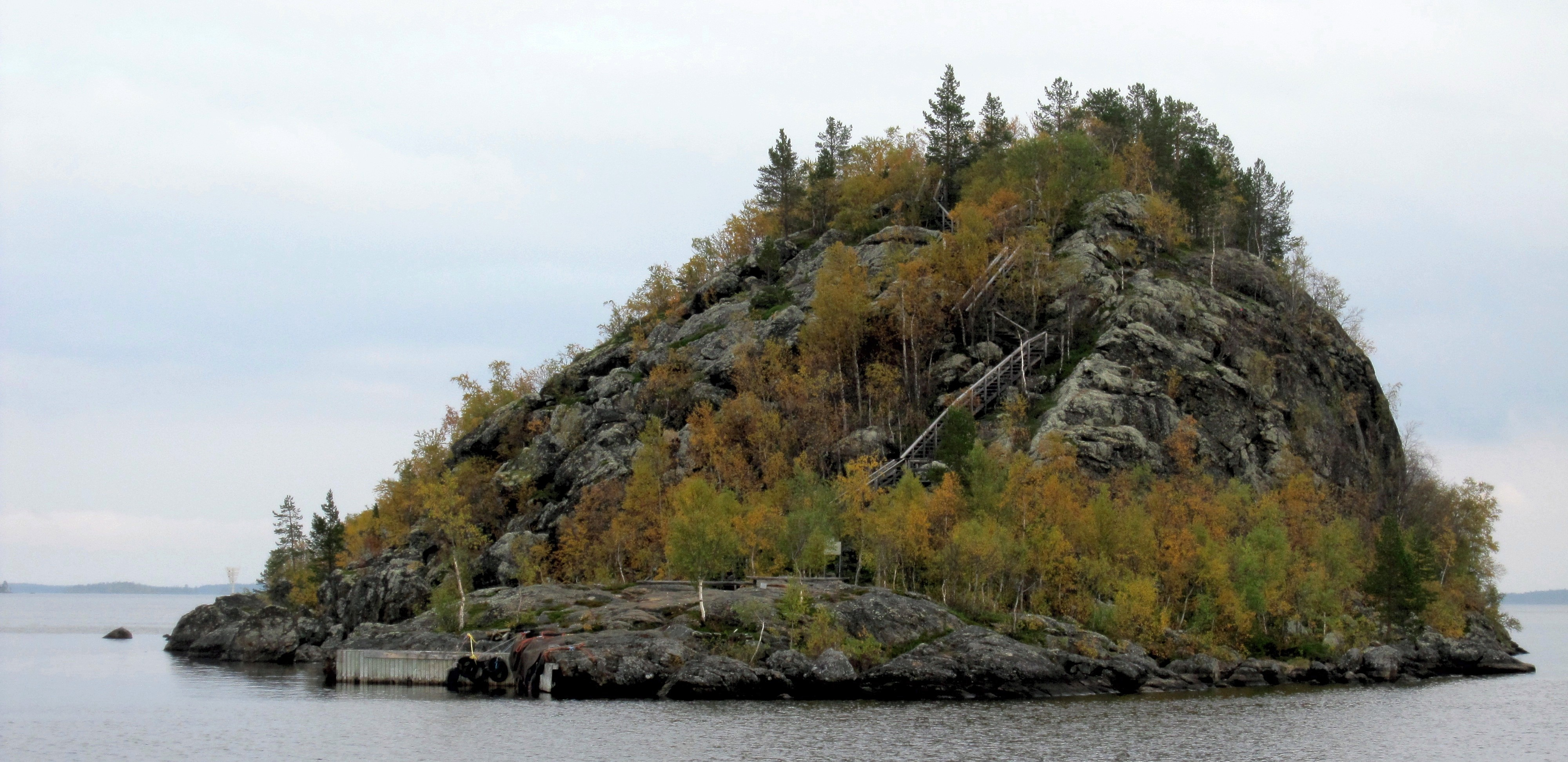
Ukonkivi (Ukko's rock, Inari Sami: Äijih) in Lake Inari in Lapland. Ukonkivi was a holy site to the local Sámi and archeological finds, apparently offerings, have been found there.

A number of toponyms in Finland and surrounding regions contain some form of the name Ukko.

=== Finland ===
- Ukko-Koli, Lieksa, Northern Karelia
- Ukonkivi (Inari Sami: Äijih), Lake Inari, Finnish Lapland
- Ukonvuori, Enonkoski, Southern Savonia
- Ukonvuori, Konnevesi, Central Finland

== Modern influence ==
The Weather Channel list of winter storms for 2012 list Ukko as one of the alphabetic names they used.

== See also ==
- Animism
- Finnish paganism
- Jumala
- Perkele
- Sky deity
- Taara
- 2020 Ukko (asteroid)
- Suomenusko (Finnish Faith) or Ukonusko (Faith of Ukko), the Finnish polytheistic reconstructionist movement
