= Vakkajuhlat =

Sacred Finnish festival

Vakkajuhlat (English: "Vakka festival". Finnish vakka "bushel", certain kind of wooden container) also known as Ukon vakat ("Ukko's vakkas". Finnish Ukko "Old man", in this context familiar term for "overlord, highest of the gods") or simply vakat (Vakkas), was a sacred festival celebrated in Finland in honor of the god Ukko.

The Vakkajuhlat were commonly held in May coinciding with the spring sowing. During vakkas it was customary to consume or otherwise offer a container or some other vessel (Finnish: vakka) of an alcoholic beverage or food as sacrifice. It appears that often the festival was held in the community's sacred grove or hiisi where an animal sacrifice was sometimes also performed as part of the same festival. This ceremony was believed to guarantee good weather for the coming year and thus a good harvest. They were often held close to holy springs, and included dancing.

After introduction of Christianity, other religious activities were banned as idolatry, but the festival continued despite this. The festival is first documented in 1542–1547, when peasantry in Savonia were fined for having celebrated what was referred to by the authorities as festivities to Thor (as the god Ukko was identified by the Swedes as the Finnish version of the god Thor). The festival is mentioned by the Finnish reformer Mikael Agricola in his account of what from his point of view was Finnish idolatry. In 1670, the festivals reportedly continued as before and it was reported that the peasantry did not consider it a sin. Reportedly, the festival was still celebrated in at least some part of the country as late as 1910.

== See also ==
- Peijaiset
