= Martti Haavio =

Finnish poet, folklorist and mythologist (1899–1973)

Martti Haavio

Martti Henrikki Haavio (22 January 1899 – 4 February 1973) was a Finnish poet, folklorist and mythologist, writing poetry under the pen name P. Mustapää. He was born on 22 January 1899 in Temmes, and died on 4 February 1973 in Helsinki. He was also a professor of folklore and an influential researcher of Finnish mythology. In 1960, Haavio married Aale Tynni, after his first wife Elsa Enäjärvi-Haavio died in 1951 of cancer. His daughter, Elina Haavio-Mannila, was a social scientist. During Haavio's early career, he was a member of the Tulenkantajat literature club.

He is buried in the Hietaniemi Cemetery in Helsinki.

== Folkloristical and mythological works ==
- Suomalaisen muinaisrunouden maailma. Porvoo: WSOY, 1935.
- Suomalaiset kodinhaltiat. Porvoo: WSOY, 1942.
- Viimeiset runonlaulajat. Third edition (second edition 1948). Porvoo: WSOY, 1985. ISBN 951-0-12753-1.
- Piispa Henrik ja Lalli: Piispa Henrikin surmavirren historiaa. Porvoo: WSOY, 1948.
- Sampo-eepos: Typologinen analyysi. A doctoral dissertation. Suomalais-ugrilaisen seuran toimituksia 96. Helsinki: Suomalais-ugrilainen seura, 1949.
- Väinämöinen: Suomalaisten runojen keskushahmo. Porvoo: WSOY, 1950.
- Kansanrunojen maailmanselitys. Helsinki Porvoo: WSOY, 1955.
- Karjalan jumalat: Uskontotieteellinen tutkimus. Porvoo: WSOY, 1959.
- Kuolematonten lehdot: Sämpsöi Pellervoisen arvoitus. Porvoo: WSOY, 1961.
- Bjarmien vallan kukoistus ja tuho: Historiaa ja runoutta. Porvoo Helsinki: WSOY, 1965.
- Suomalainen mytologia. Porvoo Helsinki: WSOY, 1967.
- Esseitä kansanrunoudesta. Articles published 1959 in Essais folkloriques par Martti Haavio. Studia Fennica 8. Suomalaisen Kirjallisuuden Seuran toimituksia 564. Helsinki: Suomalaisen Kirjallisuuden Seura, 1992. ISBN 951-717-703-8.

== Poetic works ==
- Laulu ihanista silmistä (1925)
- Laulu vaakalinnusta, (1927)
- Jäähyväiset Arkadialle (1945)
- Koiruoho, ruusunkukka (1947)
- Linnustaja (1952)
- Tuuli Airistolta (1969)
