= Uno Harva =

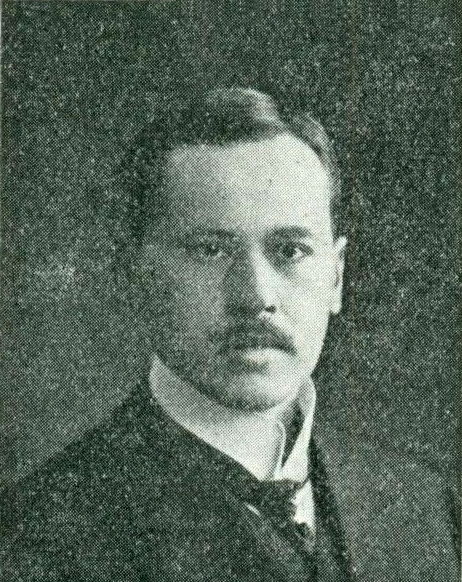
- Born: 30 August 1882; Ypäjä
- Died: 13 August 1949 (aged 66); Turku
- Other name: Uno Holmberg
- Education: University of Helsinki
- Occupations: Theology, Sociology

Uno Nils Oskar Harva (known as Uno Holmberg until 1927; 30 August 1882, Ypäjä – 13 August 1949, Turku) was a Finnish religious scholar, who founded the discipline in Finland together with Rafael Karsten. A major figure in North Eurasian ethnology and study of religion, Harva is best known for his body of work on Finno-Ugric and Altaic religions. He is considered to be one of the foremost 20th-century European interpreters of shamanism.

== Career ==
Harva conducted fieldwork among the Siberian Ket and Evenk peoples in the 1910s, researching their mythology and religion. He also spent the summers of 1911–1913 with the Finno-Ugric Votyaks (Udmurts) in the Urals and the Cheremis (the Mari people) on the Volga. He is considered to be an important anthropologist of Siberia.

His study Der Baum des Lebens (The Tree of Life; 1922–23) was the first to show that the world tree from Norse mythology had many parallels in Europe and Asia.

Harva wrote the fourth volume of the book series The Mythology of All Races in 1927. It contains a classic general description of Subarctic shamanism.

== Principal works ==
- Die Wassergottheiten der Finno-Ugrischen Völker (German: The Water Divinities of the Finno-Ugric Peoples; 1913)
- Permalaisten uskonto (1914)
- Tsheremissien uskonto (Finnish: The Cheremi Religion; 1914)
- Lappalaisten uskonto (Finnish: The Lapp Religion; 1915)
- Elämänpuu (Finnish: The Tree of Life; 1920); reprinted in German as Der Baum des Lebens (1922)
- Jumalauskon alkuperä (1916)
- Pohjoisen Euroopan ja Aasian pyyntiriiteistä (1922)
- Finno-Ugric, Siberian Mythology (1927)
- Altain suvun uskonto (1933)
- Die religiösen Vorstellungen der altaischen Völker (German: Religious Concepts of the Altaic Peoples; 1938)
- Mordvalaisten muinaisusko (1942)
- Sammon ryöstö (1943)
- Suomalaisten muinaisusko (1948)
