= Sámi drum =

Shamanic ceremonial drum in the culture of the Sámi people of Northern Europe

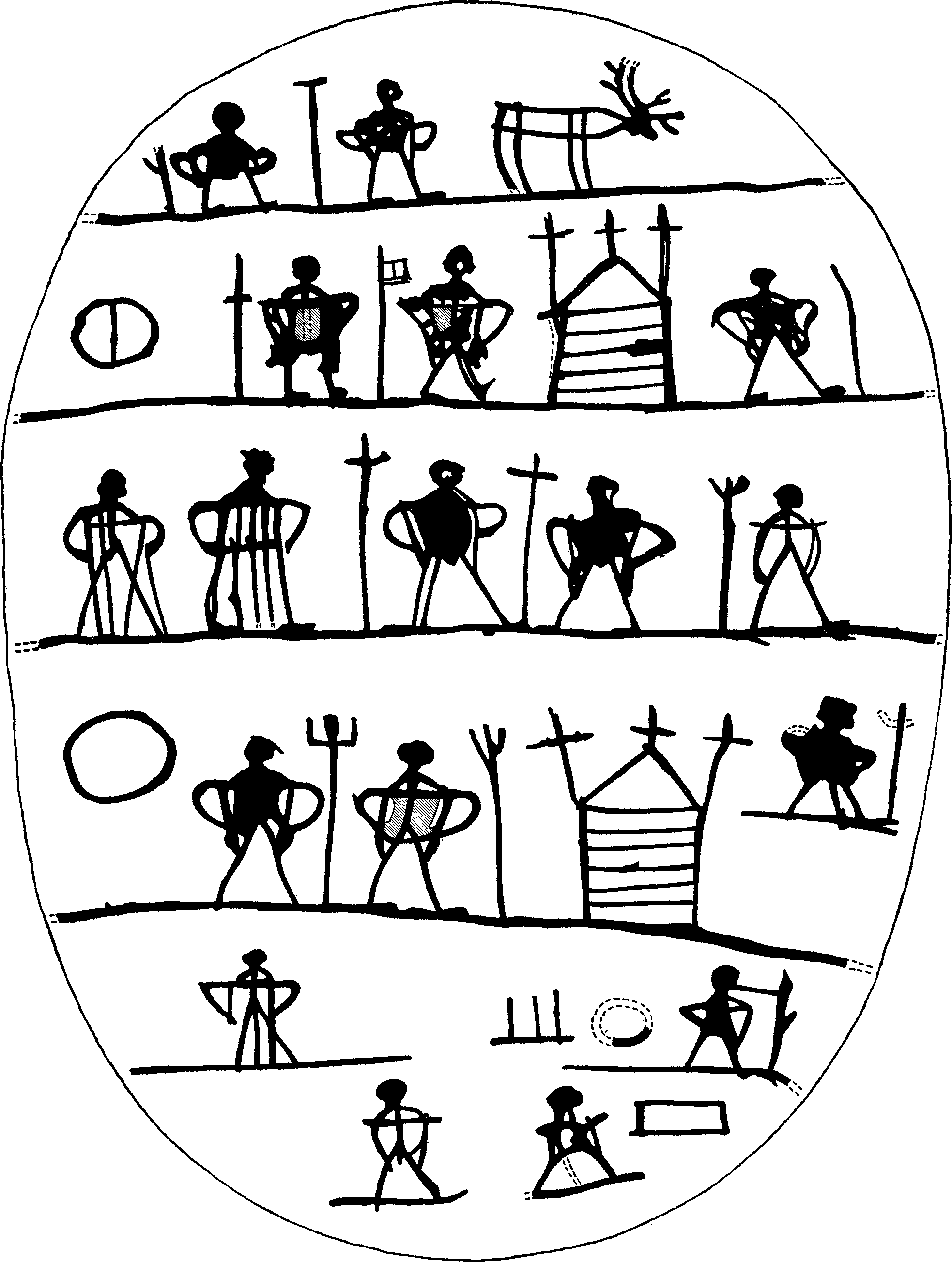
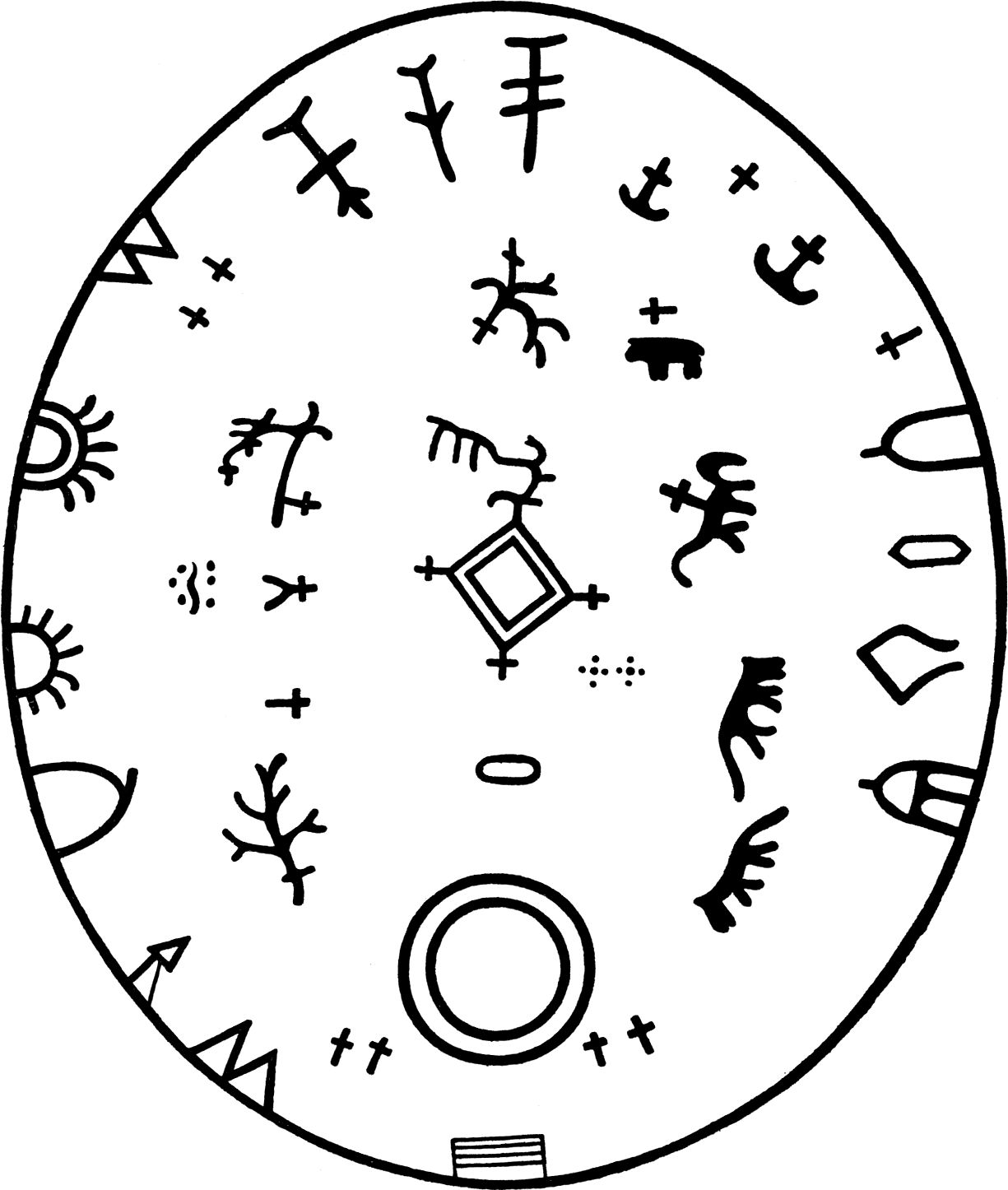
The drum of Anders Paulsen (left) and the Bindal drum (right) represent variations in Sami drums, their shape, decoration and history. Paulsen's drum was confiscated in Vadsø in 1691, while the Bindal drum was bought by a museum official in 1925; Vadsø Municipality and Bindal Municipality being in opposite corners of the Sami world. Paulsens's drum has a typical Northern Sámi pattern, with several separate levels representing the different layers of spiritual worlds. The Bindal drum has a typical Southern Sami decoration: a rhombus-shaped sun symbol in the center, with other symbols around the sun, representing people, animals, landscape and deities.

A Sámi drum, is a shamanic ceremonial drum used by the Sámi people of Northern Europe. Sámi ceremonial drums have two main variations, both oval-shaped: a bowl drum in which the drumhead is strapped over a burl, and a frame drum in which the drumhead stretches over a thin ring of bentwood. The drumhead is fashioned from reindeer hide.

In Sámi shamanism, the noaidi used the drum to get into a trance, or to obtain information from the future, or other realms. The drum was held in one hand, and beaten with the other. While the noaidi was in trance, his "free spirit" was said to leave his body to visit the spirit-world. When used for divination, the drum was beaten with a drum hammer; a vuorbi ('index' or 'pointer'), a kind of die made of brass or horn, would move around on the drumhead when the drum was struck. Future events would be predicted according to the symbols upon which the vuorbi stopped on the membrane.

The patterns on the drum membrane reflect the worldview of the owner and his family, both in religious and worldly matters, such as reindeer herding, hunting, householding, and relations with their neighbours and the non-Sámi community.

Many drums were taken out of Sámi ownership and use during the Christianization of the Sámi people in the 17th and 18th centuries. Many drums were confiscated by Sámi missionaries and other officials as a part of an intensified Christian mission towards the Sámi. Other drums were bought by collectors. Between 70 and 80 drums are preserved; the largest collection of drums is at the Nordic Museum in Stockholm.

== Terminology ==
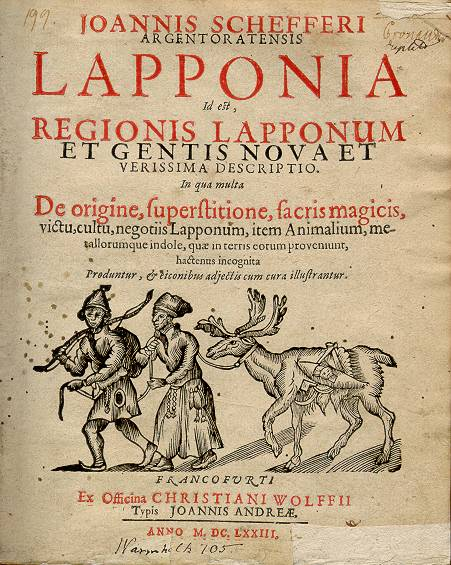
Schefferus' Lapponia (1673) is an early source for Sámi culture and religion

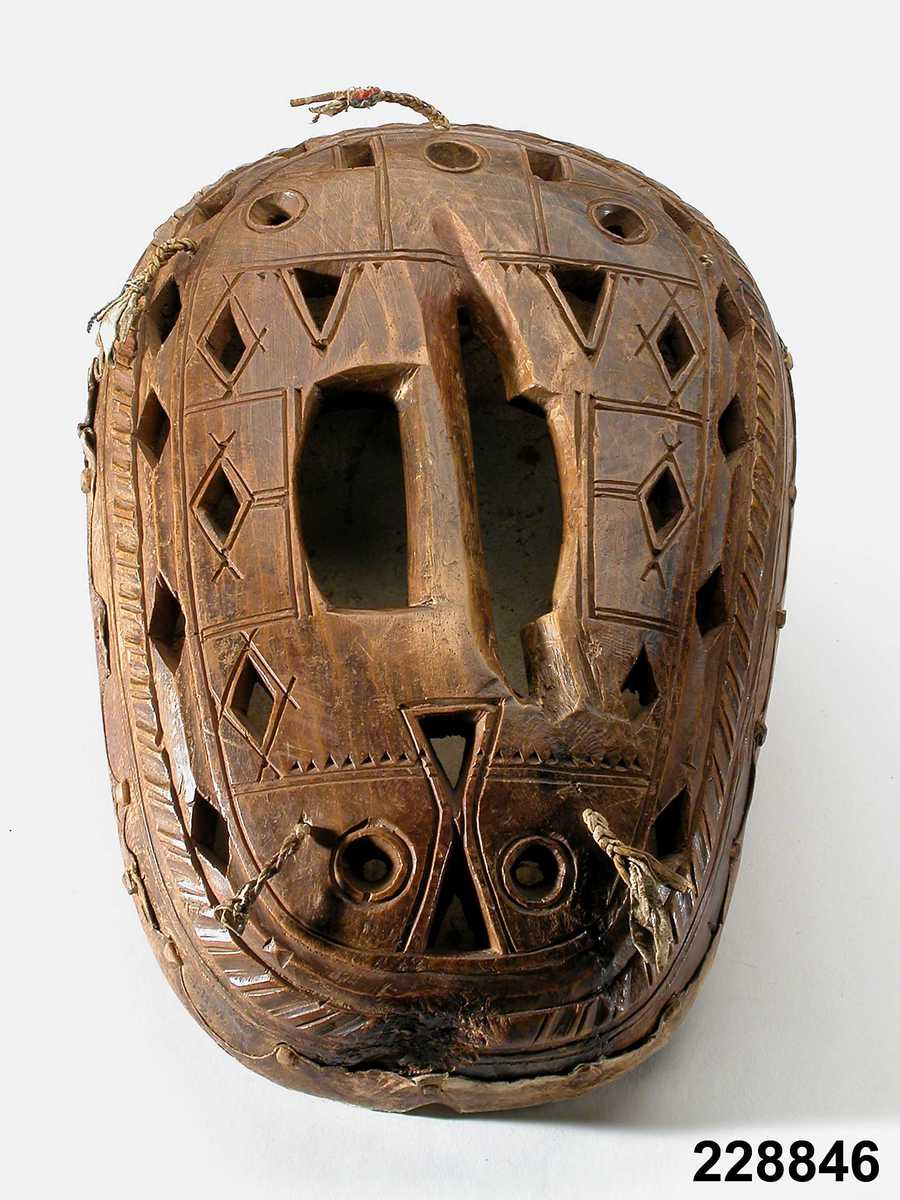
Lule Sámi bowl drum

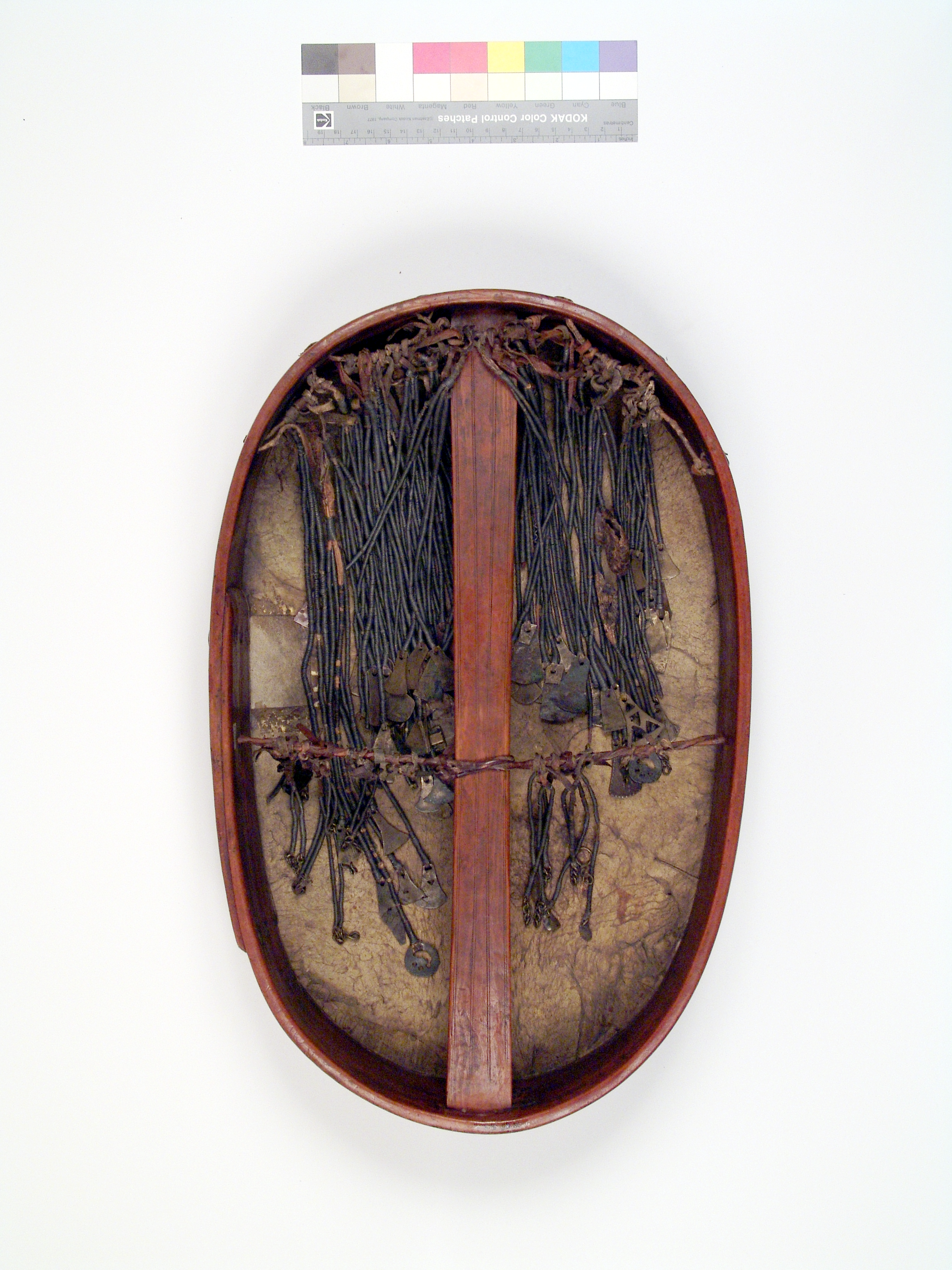
Frame drum (freavnantjahke gievrie) with cords

The Northern Sámi terms for the drum are goavddis, gobdis and meavrresgárri, while the Lule Sámi and Southern Sámi terms are goabdes and gievrie, respectively. Norwegian: runebomme, Swedish: nåjdtrumma; In English it is also known as a rune drum or Sámi shamanic drum.

The Northern Sámi name goavddis describes a bowl drum, while the Southern Sámi name gievrie describes a frame drum, corresponding to the distribution of these types of drums. Another Northern Sámi name, meavrresgárri, is a cross-language compound word: Sámi meavrres, from meavrit and Finnish möyriä ('dig, roar, mess'), plus gárri from Norwegian kar ('cup, bowl').

The common Norwegian name for the drum, runebomme, is based on an earlier misunderstanding of the symbols on the drum, which interpreted them as runes. Suggested new names in Norwegian are sjamantromme ("shaman drum") or sametromme ('Sámi drum'). The original Swedish name, trolltrumma, comes from the Christian perception of Sámi religion as witchcraft (trolldom), and it is now considered derogatory. In his Fragments of Lappish Mythology (ca 1840) Læstadius used the term divination drum ("spåtrumma"). In Swedish today, the term that's commonly used is samiska trumman ('the Sámi drum').

== Sources on the history of the drums ==
There are four categories of sources for the history of the drums. First are the drums themselves, and what might be interpreted from them. Secondly, there are reports and treatises on Sámi subjects from the 17th and 18th centuries, written by Norwegian and Swedish priests, missionaries or other civil servants, like Johannes Schefferus. The third category are statements from Saami themselves, given to legal courts or other official representatives. The fourth are the sporadic references to drums and Sámi shamanism in other sources, such as Historia Norvegiæ (late 12th century).

The oldest mention of a Sámi drum and shamanism is in the anonymous Historia Norvegiæ (late 12th century). It mentions a drum with symbols of marine animals, a boat, reindeer and snowshoes. There is also a description of a shaman healing an apparently dead woman by moving his spirit into a whale. Peder Claussøn Friis describes a noaidi's spirit leaving the body in his Norriges oc omliggende Øers sandfærdige Bescriffuelse (1632). The oldest description by a Sámi is by Anders Huitlok of the Pite Sámi in 1642 about a drum that he owned. Huitlok also made a drawing; his story was written down by the German-Swedish bergmeister Hans P. Lybecker. Huitlok's drum represents a worldview where deities, animals and the living and the dead are working together within a given landscape. The court protocols from the trials against Anders Paulsen in Vadsø in 1692 and against Lars Nilsson in Arjeplog in 1691 are also sources.

During the 17th century, the Swedish government commissioned a work to gain more knowledge of the Sámi and their culture. During the Thirty Years' War (1618–48) rumours were spread that the Swedes won their battles with the help of Sámi witchcraft. Such rumours were part of the background for the research that lead to Johannes Schefferus' book Lapponia, published in Latin in 1673. For Schefferus, a number of "priests' correspondences" (prästrelationer) were written by vicars within the Sámi districts of Sweden. Treatises by Samuel Rheen, Olaus Graan, Johannes Tornæus and Nicolai Lundius were the sources used by Schefferus. In Norway, the main source are writings from the mission of Thomas von Westen and his colleagues from 1715 until 1735. Authors were Hans Skanke, Jens Kildal, Isaac Olsen, and Johan Randulf (the Nærøy manuscript). These books were, in part, instructions for the missionaries and their co-workers, and part documentation, intended for the government in Copenhagen. Late books within this tradition are Pehr Högström's Beskrifning Öfwer de til Sweriges Krona lydande Lapmarker (1747) in Sweden and Knud Leem's Beskrivelse over Finmarkens Lapper (1767) in Denmark-Norway. Notable is especially Læstadius' Fragments of Lappish Mythology (1839–45), which both discusses earlier treatises with a critical approach, and builds upon Læstadius' own experience.

== The shape of the drums ==
=== Wood ===
The drums are always oval; the exact shape of the oval would vary with the kind of wood used. Drums which still exist are of four different types, and can be divided into two main groups: bowl drums and frame drums.

1. In bowl drums, the wood consists of a burl shaped into a bowl. The burl usually comes from pine, but sometimes from spruce. The membrane is attached to the wood with a sinew.
2. Frame drums are shaped by wet or heat bending; the wood is usually pine, and the membrane is sewn to holes in the frame with sinew.
3. Ring drums are made from a naturally grown piece of pine wood. There is only one known drum of this type.
4. Angular-cut frame drums are made from one piece of wood cut from a tree. To bend the wood into an oval, angular cuts are made in the bottom and the side of the frame. Only two such drums are preserved, both from Kemi Sámi districts in Finland. The partly preserved drum from Bjørsvik in Nordland is also an angular-cut frame drum.

In his major work on Sámi drums, Die lappische Zaubertrommel, Ernst Manker lists 41 frame drums, one ring drum, two angular-cut frame drums and 27 bowl drums. Given these numbers, many tend to divide the drums into two main groups: bowl drums and frame drums, seeing the others as variations. Judged by these remaining drums and their known provenance, frame drums seem to be more common in the Southern Sámi areas, and bowl drums seem to be common in the Northern Sámi areas. The bowl drum is sometimes regarded as a local adjustment of the basic drum type, this being the frame drum. The frame drum type is more reminiscent of other ceremonial drums used by the indigenous peoples of Siberia.

=== The membrane and its symbols ===
A regional typology of drum patterns, with some variations used by K.B. Wiklund (1930), Ernst Manker and Kjellström & Rydving.

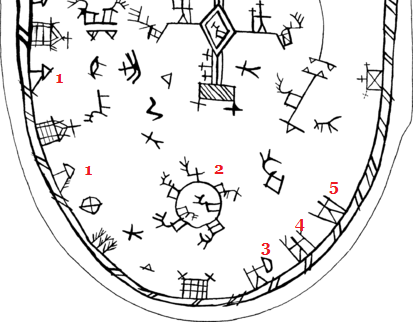
Excerpt of a Southern Sámi drum with emphasis on three typical motifs: the storage house (1), the reindeer corral (2) and the goddesses Sáráhkká, Juoksáhkká and Uksáhkká (3-5).

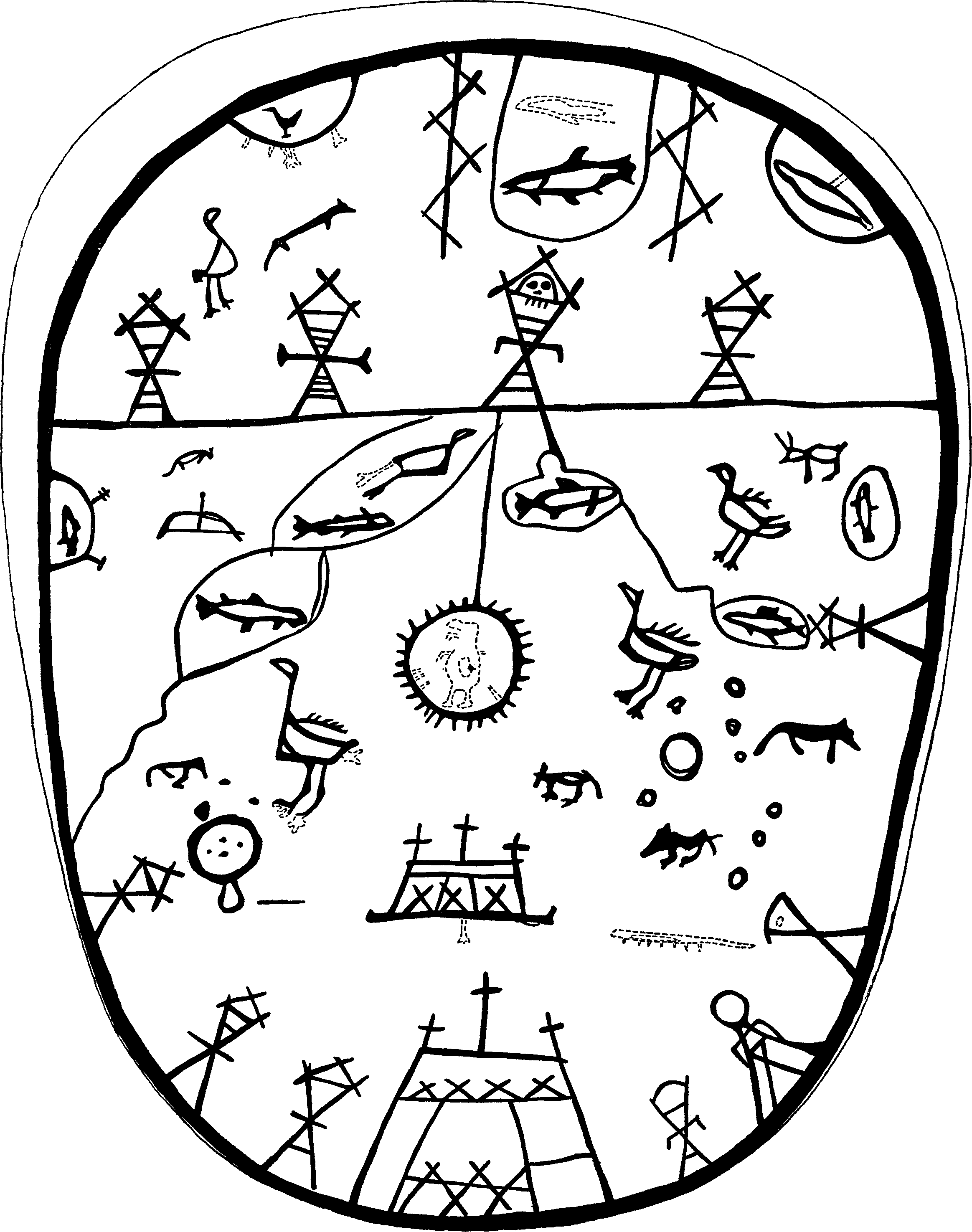
This drum from the Lule Sámi area has a unique mix of motifs: fish, fur animals, and game birds; thus representing a drum owner who was more of a hunter than a reindeer herder.

The membrane is made of untanned reindeer hide. Lars Olsen, who described his uncle's drum, the Bindal drum, in 1885, said that the hide was usually taken from the neck of a reindeer calf because of its thickness. The symbols were painted with a paste made from alder bark.

The motifs on a drum reflect the worldview of the owner and his family, both in terms of religious beliefs and in their modes of subsistence. A world is depicted via images of reindeer, both domesticated and wild, and of carnivorous predators that pose a threat to the herd. The modes of subsistence are presented by scenes of wild game hunting, boats with fishing nets, and reindeer herding. Additional imagery on the drum consists of mountains, lakes, people, deities, as well as the camp-site with tents and storage-houses. Symbols of foreign civilizations, such as churches and houses, represent the threats from the surrounding and expanding non-Sámi community. Each owner chose his set of symbols; there are no two drums with identical sets of symbols. The drum mentioned in the medieval Latin tome Historia Norvegiæ, with motifs such as whales, reindeer, skis and a boat would have belonged to a coastal Sámi. The Lule Sámi drum reflects an owner who found his mode of subsistence chiefly through hunting, rather than herding.

A typology based on the structure of the patterns can be divided into three main categories:

1. Southern Sámi, characterized by the rhombus-shaped sun cross in the center
2. Central Sámi, where the membrane is divided in two by a horizontal line, often with a solar symbol in the lower section
3. Northern Sámi, where the membrane is divided by horizontal lines into three or five separate levels representing different worlds: the heavens, the world of the living and an underworld.

In Manker's overview of 71 known drums, there are 42 Southern Sámi drums, 22 Central Sámi drums and seven Northern Sámi drums.

The Bindal drum is a typical Southern Sámi drum, with the sun-symbol in its center. Its last owner also explained that the symbols on the membrane were organized according to the four cardinal directions around the sun. South is described as the "summer side" or "the direction of life," and contains symbols of the Sámi's life in the fells during summer: the goahti, the storehouse or njalla, the herd of reindeer, and their pastures. North is described as "the side of death," and contains symbols of sickness, death and wickedness.

Kjellström and Rydving have summarised the symbols of the drums in the following categories: nature, reindeer, bears, elk, other mammals (wolf, beaver, small fur animals), birds, fish, hunting, fishing, reindeer-herding, the camp site – with goahti, njalla and other storehouses, the non-Sámi village – often represented by the church, people, travel (skiing, reindeer with pulk, boats), and deities and their worlds. Sometimes even the use of the drum itself is depicted.

The reindeer-herding is mainly depicted with a circular symbol for the reindeer corral that was used to gather, mark and milk the flock. This symbol is found on 75% of the Southern Sámi drums, but not on any northern or eastern drums. The symbol for the corral is always placed in the lower half of the drum. Reindeer are represented as singular line figures, as fully modeled figures or by their antlers. The campsite is usually shown as a triangle symbolizing the tent/goahti. The Sámi storehouse (njalla) is depicted on many drums from different areas. The njalla is a small hut in bear cache style, built on top of a cut tree. It is usually depicted with its ladder in front.

Sámi deities are shown on several drum membranes. These are the high god Ráðði, the demiurge and sustainer Varaldi olmmai, the thunder and fertility god Horagallis, the weather god Bieggolmmái, the hunting god Leaibolmmái, the sun god Beaivi / Biejjie, the mother goddesses Máttaráhkká, Sáráhkká, Juoksáhkká and Uksáhkká, the riding Ruto spirit who brought sickness and death, and Jábmeáhkká – the empress of the underworld.

Some subjects from the non-Sámi world also appears on several drums. These are interpreted as attempts to understand and master the new influences interacting with the Sámi society. Churches, houses and horses appear on several drums, and drums from Torne and Kemi districts show both the city, the church and the lapp commissary.

Interpretation of the drums' symbols might be difficult, and different explanations have been proposed for several of the symbols. It has often been assumed that the Sámi deliberately gave misleading explanations when they presented their drums to missionaries and other Christian audiences, in order to downplay the pagan elements and emphasise the Christian impact on Sámi culture. However, it has also been proposed that some of the symbols have been over-interpreted as religious motifs, when they actually represented matters of everyday life.

Håkan Rydving evaluated the drum symbols from a perspective of source criticism, and divides them into four categories:

1. Preserved drums that were explained by their owners. These are only two such drums: Anders Paulsen's drum and the Freavnantjahke gievrie.
2. Preserved drums that were explained by other people, contemporary to the owners. These are five such drums, four Southern Sami and one Ume Sami.
3. Lost drums that were explained by contemporaries, either the owner or other people. There are four of these drums.
4. Preserved drums without a contemporary explanation. These make up the majority of the 70 known drums.

Rydving and Kjellström have demonstrated that both Olov Graan's drum fra Lycksele and the Freavnantjahke gievrie have been spiritualized through Manker's interpretations: When the explanations are compared, it appears as if Graan relates the symbols to household life and modes of subsistence, where Manker sees deities and spirits. This underlines the problems of interpretation. Symbols that Graan explains as snowy weather, a ship, rain and squirrels in the trees, are interpreted by Manker as the wind god Bieggolmai/Biegkålmaj, a boat sacrifice, a weather god and – among other suggestions – as a forest spirit. At the Freavnantjahke gievrie there is a symbol explained by the owner as "a Sámi riding in his pulk behind his reindeer", while Manker suggests that "this might be an ordinary sleigh ride, but we might as well assume that this is the noaidi, the drum owner, going on an important errand into the spiritual world". On the other hand, one might suggest that the owner of the Freavnantjahke gievrie, Bendik Andersen, is de-emphasising the spiritual content of the drum when the symbols usually recognized as the three mother goddesses are explained away by him as "men guarding the reindeer".

=== Tools ===
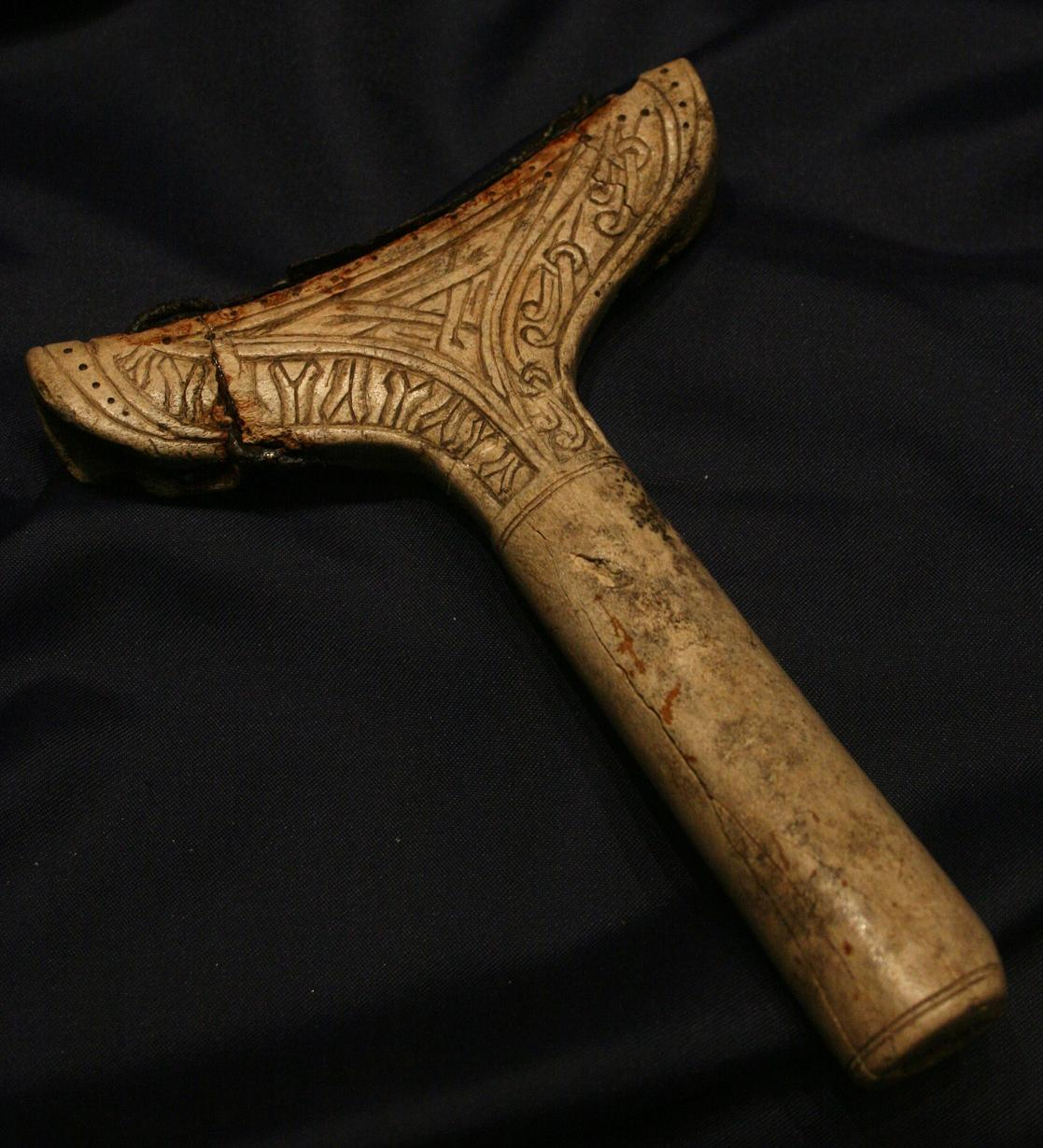
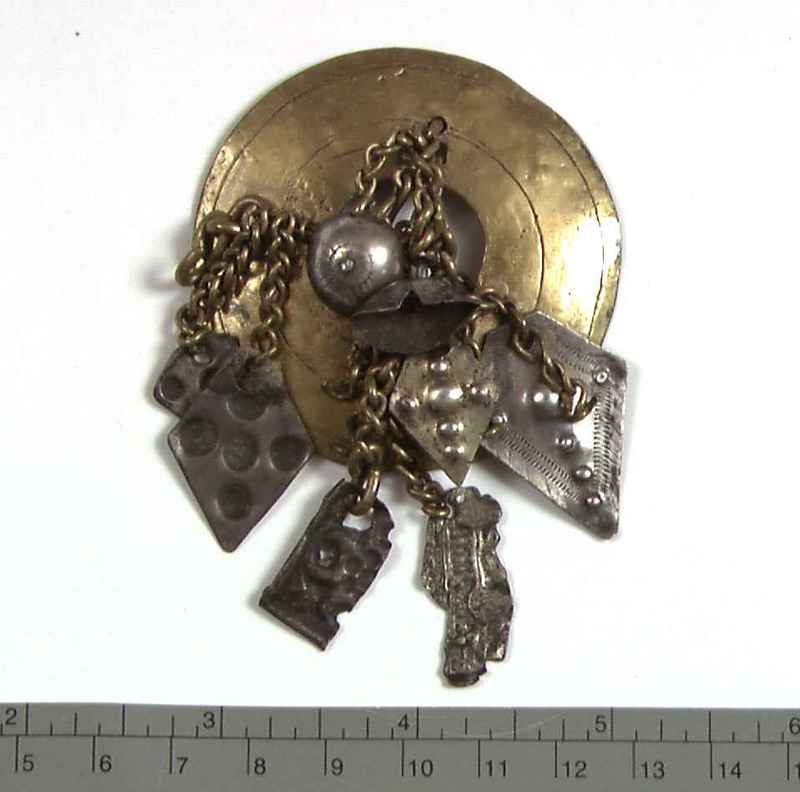
The drum hammer from Rendalen (left) has a typical, symmetric T-shape. This hammer from the 11th century is regarded as an indicator of early Sámi presence in southern Norway. The vuorbi ('pointer', 'index') was made of brass, horn or bone.

The primary tools used when working with the drum are mainly the drum hammer and one or two vuorbi for each drum. The drums also had different kinds of cords as well as "bear nails".

The drum hammer (Northern Sami: bállin) was usually made of horn and was T- or Y-shaped, with two symmetric heads, and with geometric decorations. Some hammers have tails made of leather straps, or have leather or tin wires wrapped around the shaft. Manker (1938) knew and described 38 drum hammers. The drum hammer was used for both trance drumming and, together with the vuorbi, for divination.

The vuorbi ('index' or 'pointer'; Northern Sámi vuorbi, bajá or árpa; Southern Sámi viejhkie) used for divination was made of brass, horn or bone, and sometimes of wood.

The cords are leather straps nailed or tied to the frame, or to the bottom of the drum. They had pieces of bone or metal tied to them. The owner of the Freavnantjahke gievrie, Bendix Andersen Frøyningsfjell, explained to Thomas von Westen in 1723 that the leather straps and their decorations of tin, bone and brass were offers of gratitude to the drum, given by the owner as a response to good luck gained via the messages the shaman received when using the drum. The frame of the Freavnantjahke gievrie also had 11 tin nails in it, in a cross shape. Bendix explained them as an indicator of the number of bears killed thanks to instructions given by the drum. Manker found similar bear nails in 13 drums. Other drums had a baculum from a bear or a fox among the cords.

== Using the drum ==
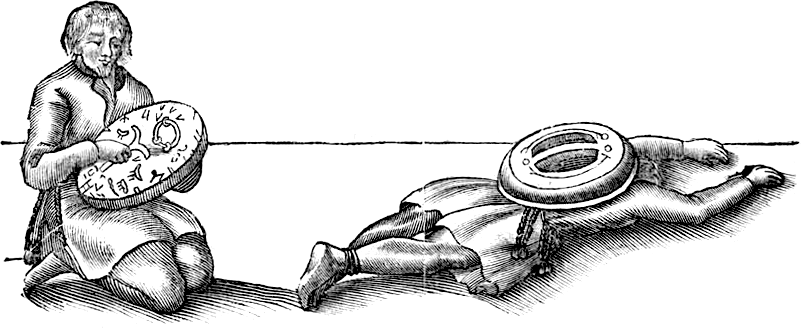
A Sámi noaidi with his drum and subsequently in trance; as illustrated in Johannes Schefferus's Lapponia (1673). Isaac Olsen wrote: "hand falder i En Dvalle lige som død og bliver svart og blaa i ansigtet, og mens hand saa liger som død, da kand hand forrette saadant, og mange som er nær død, og siunis som død for menniskens øyen, de kand blive straxt frisk igjen paa samme timme, og naar hand liger i saadan besvimmelse eller Dvalle, da kand han fare vide om kring og forretter meget og kand fortælle mangfoldigt og undelige ting, naar hand opvogner, som hand haver seet og giort, og kand fare vide om landene og i mange steder og føre tidende derfra og føre vise tegen og mercke med sig der fra naar hand er beden der om, og da farer hand og saa i strid i mod sine modstandere og kampis som i En anden verden, indtil at den Ene har lagt livet igien, og er over vunden".

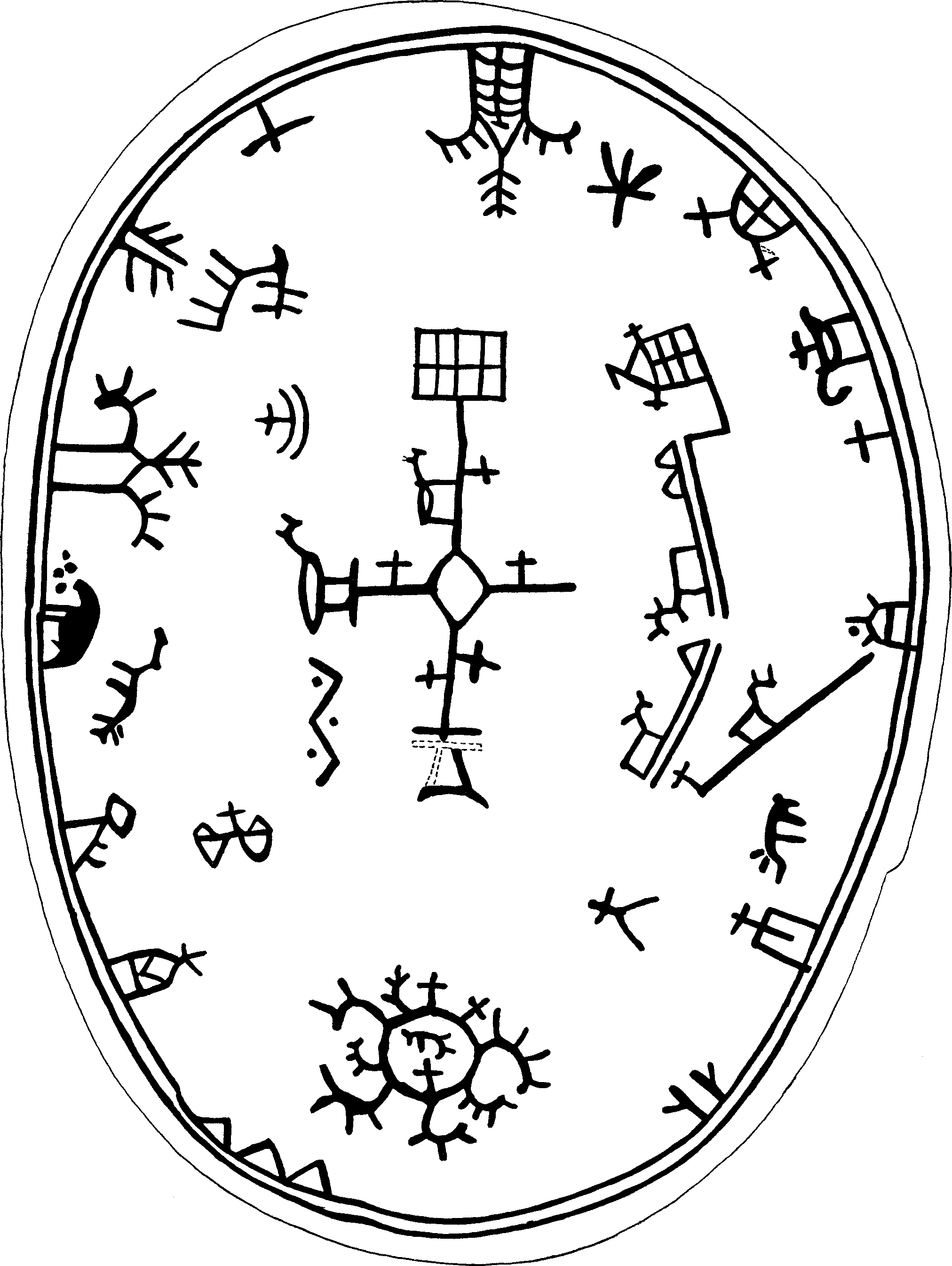
This drum belonged to Morten Olofsson, a Sámi of Åsele, until it was confiscated on New Year's Day 1725 by Petrus Asp, bishop of Härnosand. On this day, 26 drums were confiscated. These drums were all of the same main type of Southern Sámi drum, known as the Åsele type. Twenty of these now belong to Nordiska museet, and they form a large part of the total number of preserved drums.

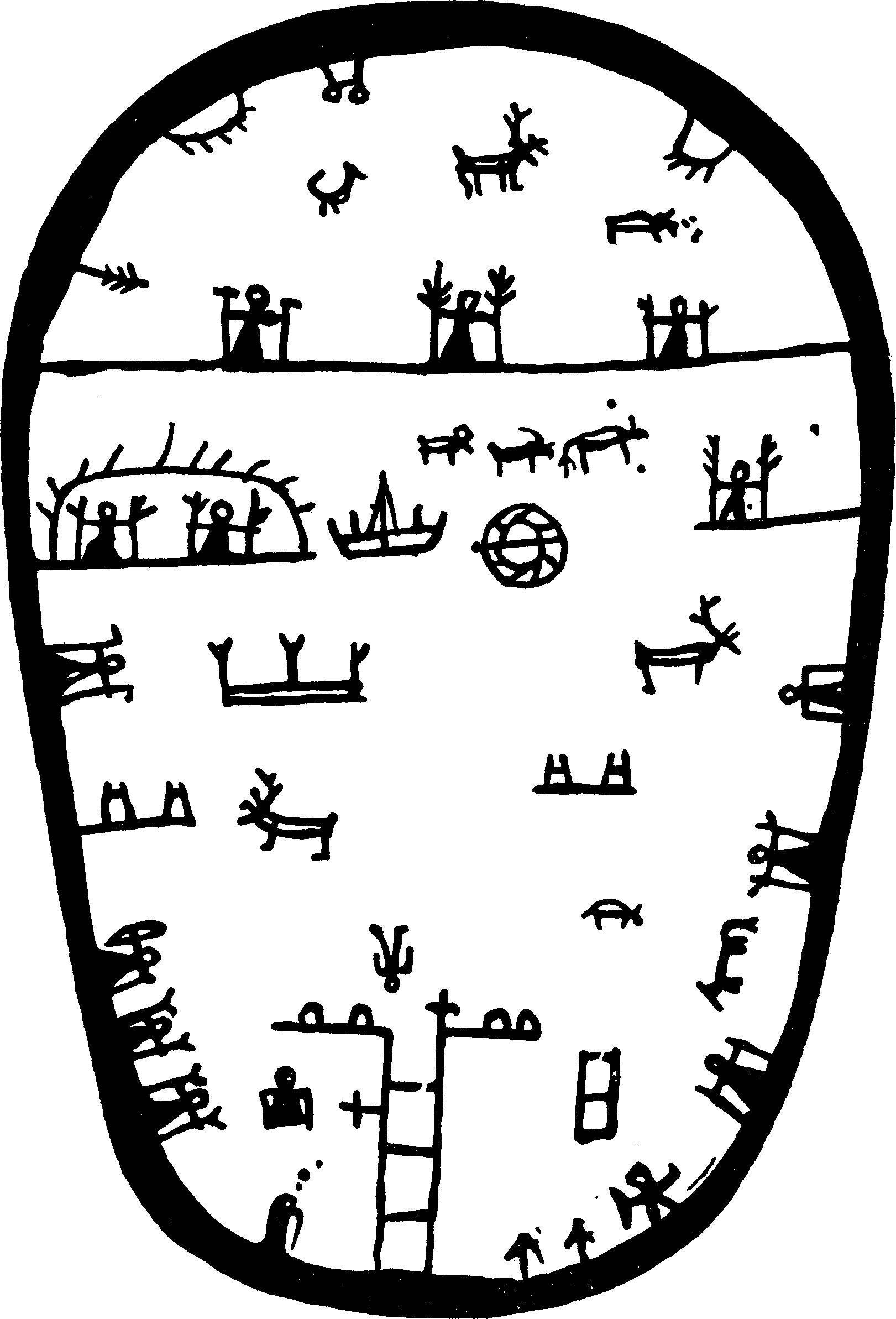
Drum from Lule Sámi areas. Mentioned by Schefferus in 1673; now at Nordiska museet.

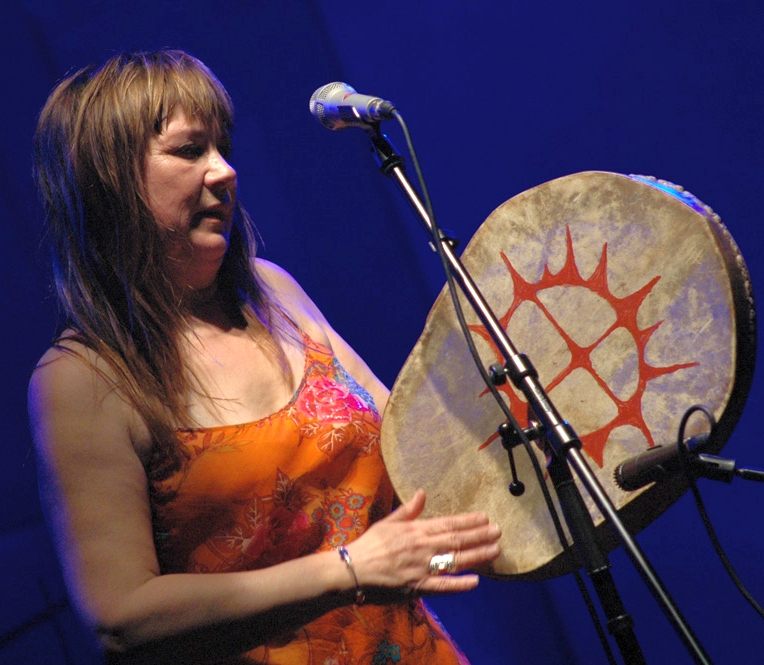
Mari Boine with a modern drum. Drums are now used both as musical instruments and as symbols of Sámi identity.

Ernst Manker summarized the use of the drum, regarding both trance and divination:

- before use, the membrane was tightened by holding the drum close to the fire
- the user stood on his knees, or sat with his legs crossed, holding the drum in his left hand
- the vuorbi was placed on the membrane, either in a fixed starting place or one chosen at random
- the hammer was held in the right hand; the membrane was struck either with one of the hammer heads, or with the flat side of the hammer
- the drumming started at a slow pace, and grew wilder
- if the drummer fell into a trance, his drum was placed upon him, with the painted membrane facing downwards
- the route of the vuorbi across the membrane, and the places where it stopped, were interpreted as significant

Samuel Rheen, who was a priest in Kvikkjokk 1664–1671, was one of the first to write about Sámi religion. His impression was that many Sámi, but not all, used the drum for divination. Rheen mentioned four kinds of things the drum could give:

1. knowledge about what was happening elsewhere
2. knowledge about luck, misfortune, health, and illness
3. curing diseases
4. advice on which deity one should sacrifice unto

Of these four things mentioned by Rheen, other sources state that the first of them was only performed by the noaidi. Based on the sources, one might get the impression that the use of the drum was gradually "democratized", so that there in some regions there was a drum in each household, and that the father of the household could use it to seek advice. Yet the original use of the drum, inducing trance work, seems to have remained a specialty of the shaman.

Sources seem to agree that in Southern Sámi districts in the 18th century, each household had its own drum. These were mostly used for divination. The types and the configurations of the motifs on the Southern Sámi drums suggest it was, indeed, used for divination. On the other hand, the configurations of the Northern Sámi drum motifs, with their hierarchical structures of the worlds, represent a mythological universe in which it was the noaidi's privilege to wander.

The drum was usually carried along on nomadic wanderings. There are also reports of drums being hidden close to regular campsites. Inside the lavvu and the goahti, the drum was always placed in the boaššu, the space behind the fireplace that was considered the "holy room" of the goahti.

Several contemporary sources describe a dual view of the drums: they were seen both as occult devices and as divination tools for practical purposes. Drums were inherited. Not all of those who owned drums in the 18th century described themselves as active users of their drum--at least that was what they insisted when the drums were confiscated.

There is no known evidence of the drum or the noaidi having had any role in childbirth or funeral rituals.

Some sources suggest that the drum was manufactured with the aid of secret rituals. However, Manker made a photo documentary describing the drum-making process. The selection of the motifs for the membrane, or the philosophy behind it, are not described in any sources. It is known that the dedication of a new drum featured rituals that involved the whole household.

=== In trance ===
The noaidi used the drum to induce a state of trance. He hit the drum with an intense rhythm until he went into a trance or sleep-like state. While in this state, his free spirit could travel into the spirit-worlds, or to other places in the material world. The episode mentioned in Historia Norvegiæ tells about a noaidi who traveled to the spirit-world and fought against enemy spirits in order to heal the sick. The writings of Peder Claussøn Friis (1545–1614) describe a Sámi in Bergen who could supposedly travel in the material world while he was in a trance: a Sámi named Jakob made his spirit-journey to Germany to learn about the health of a German merchant's family.

Both Nicolai Lundius (ca 1670), Isaac Olsen (1717) and Jens Kildal (ca. 1730) describe noaidis traveling to spirit-worlds where they negotiated with death deities, especially Jábmeáhkka--the queen of the realm of the dead--regarding people's health and lives. This journey involved risks to the noaidi's own life and health.

=== Divination and luck ===
In the writings of both Samuel Rheen and Isaac Olsen, the drum is mentioned as a part of the preparations for a bear hunt. Rheen says that the noaidi could give information about hunting fortune, while Olsen suggests that the noaidi was able to manipulate the bear to move into the hunters' range. The noaidi--or the drum's owner--was a member of the group of hunters, following on the heels of the spear bearer. The noaidi also sat at a prominent place during the feast after the hunting.

In Fragments of Lappish Mythology (1840–45), Lars Levi Læstadius writes that the Sámi used his drum as an oracle, and consulted it when some important matter was at hand. "Just like any other kind of fortune-telling with cards or dowsing. One should not consider every drum owner a magician." A common practice was to let the vuorbi move across the membrane, visiting the different symbols. The noaidi would interpret the will of the gods by the route taken by the vuorbi. Such practices are described in conjunction with the Bindal drum, the Freavnantjahke gievrie and the Velfjord drum.

=== Women ===
Whether women were allowed to use the drum has been debated, but no consensus has yet been reached. On one hand, some sources say that women were not even allowed to touch the drum, and during herd migration, women should follow another route than the sleigh that carried the drum. On the other, the whole family was involved in the initiation of the drum. Also, the participation of joiking women was of importance for a successful spirit-journey.

May-Lisbeth Myrhaug has reinterpreted the sources from the 17th and 18th century, and suggests that there is evidence of female noaidi, including spirit-travelling female noaidi.

In contrast to the claim that only men could be noaidi and use the drum, there are examples of Sami women who did use the drum. Kirsten Klemitsdotter (d. 1714), Rijkuo-Maja of Arvidsjaur (1661-1757) and Anna Greta Matsdotter of Vapsten, known as Silbo-gåmmoe or Gammel-Silba (1794-1870), are examples of women noted to have used the drum.

== Drums after Christianisation ==
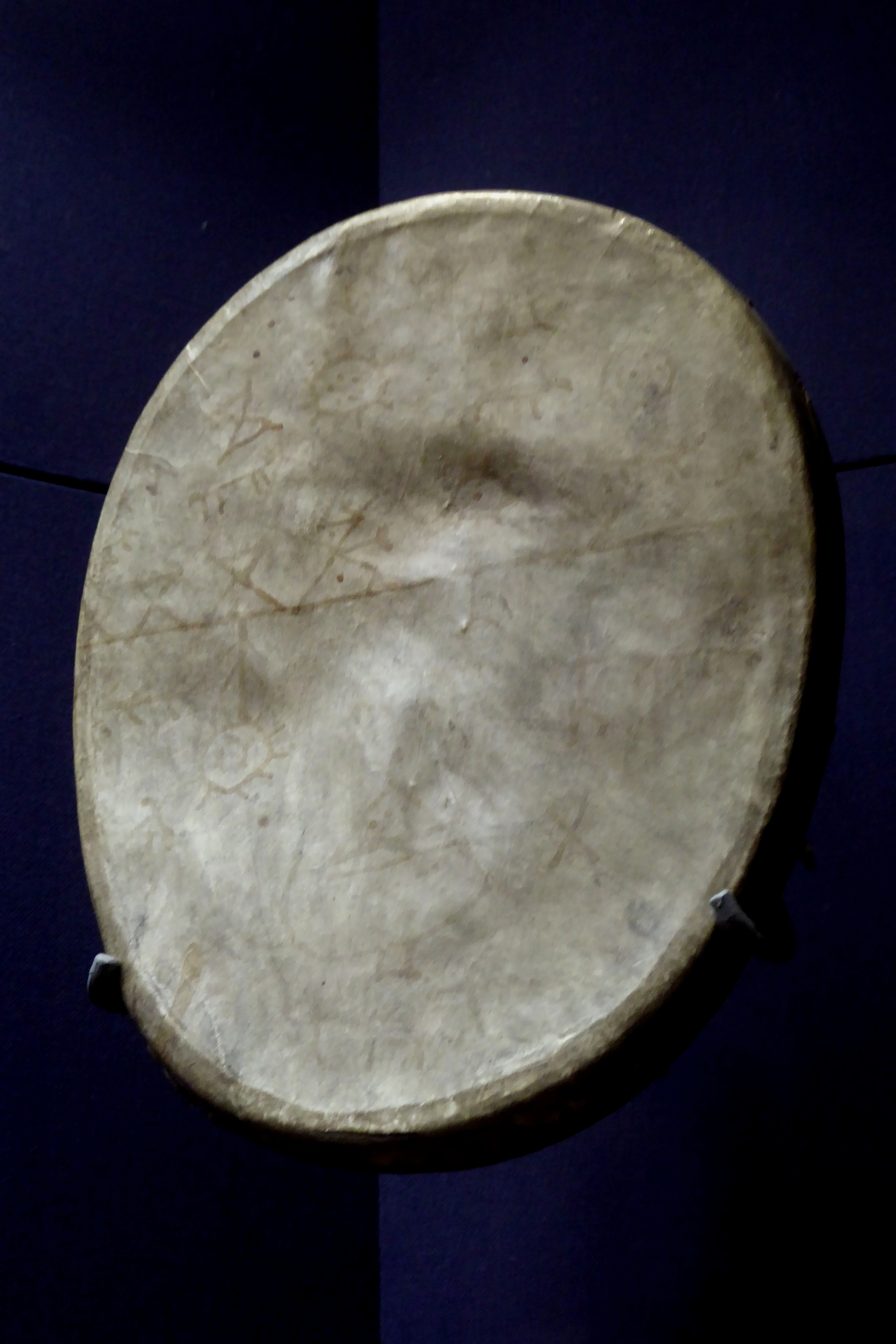
Small 18th Century Sami Drum in the Cambridge University Museum of Archaeology and Anthropology

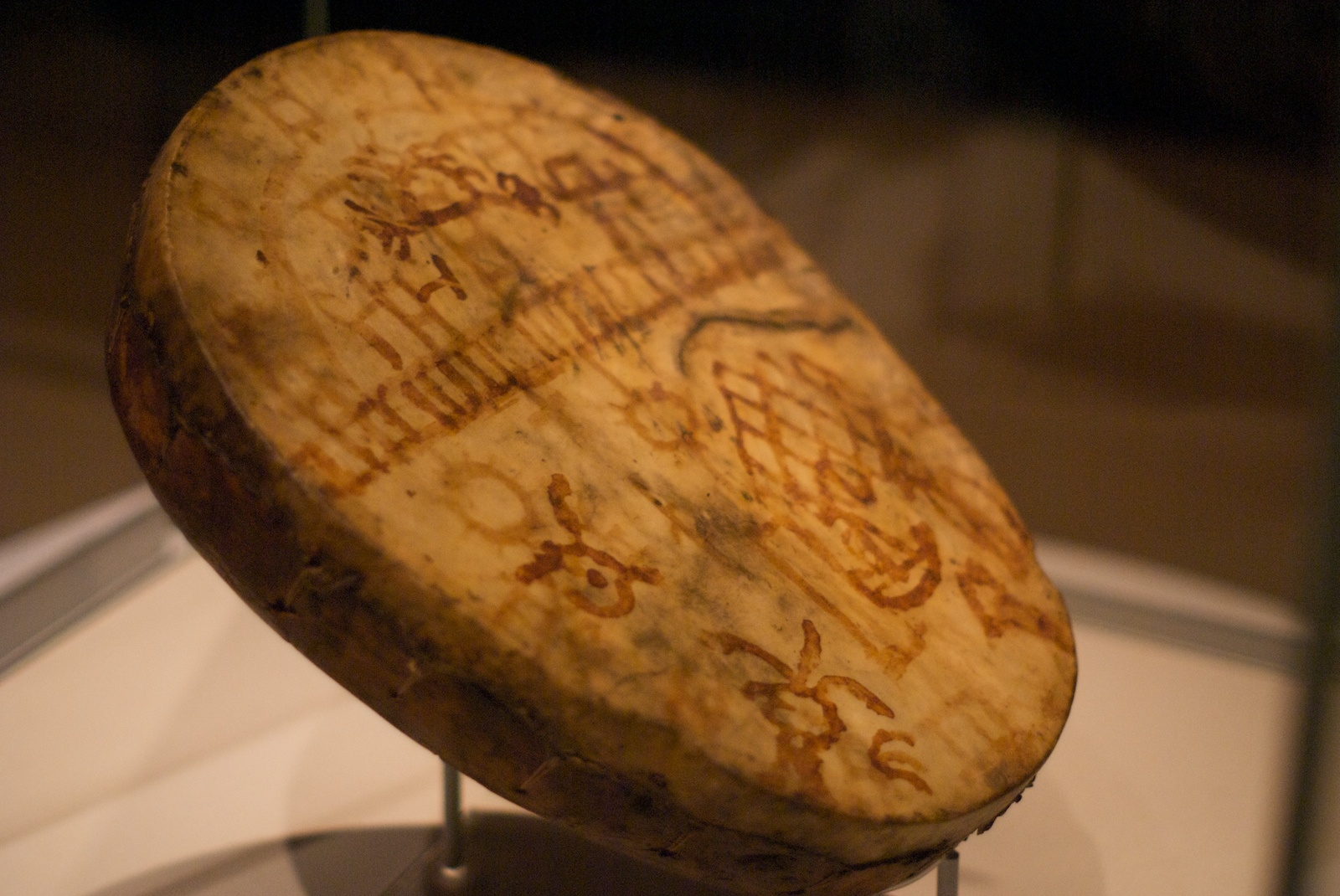
Sami drum in the British Museum, London

In the 17th and 18th centuries, several raids were made to confiscate drums, both in Sweden and in Denmark-Norway, during the Christianization of the Sámi people. Thomas von Westen and his colleagues considered the drums to be "the Bible of the Sámi", and wanted to eradicate what they saw as "idolatry" by destroying or removing the drums. Any uncontrolled, "idol-worshipping" Sámi were considered a threat to the government. The increased missionary efforts towards the Sámi in the early 18th century might be explained as a consequence of the government's desire to controle the citizens under the era of absolute monarchy in Denmark-Norway, and also as a consequence of the increased emphasis on an individual Christian faith in pietism, popular at the time.

In Åsele, Sweden, 2 drums were collected in 1686, 8 drums in 1689 and 26 drums in 1725, mainly of the Southern Sámi type. Thomas von Westen collected about a hundred drums from the Southern Sámi district; 8 of them were collected at Snåsa in 1723. 70 of von Westen's drums were lost in the Copenhagen Fire of 1728. von Westen found few drums during his journeys in the Northern Sámi districts between 1715 and 1730. This might be explained by the advanced Christianisation of the Sámi in the north, in that the drums had already been destroyed. It might also be explained through the differences in the ways the drums were used in Northern and Southern Sámi cultures, respectively. While the drum was a common household item in Southern Sámi culture, it might have been a rare object, reserved for the few educated noaidi in Northern Sámi culture.

Probably the best-known is the Linné Drum – a drum that was given to Carl Linnaeus during his visits to northern Sweden. He later gave it to a museum in France, and it was later brought back to the Swedish National Museum. Three Sámi drums can be found in the collections of the British Museum, including one bequeathed by Sir Hans Sloane, founder of the museum. Over 30 drums are held at the Nordiska Museet, Stockholm; with others held in Rome, Berlin, Leipzig and Hamburg. Cambridge University’s Museum of Archaeology and Anthropology, the Pitt Rivers Museum in Oxford and London's Horniman Museum all hold examples of Sami drums.

Anders Poulsen's drum became part of the Danish Royal Collection after his trial and death. It eventually entered the collections of the National Museum of Denmark and was on loan to the Sámi Museum in Karasjok, northern Norway, from 1979. Following "a 40-year struggle" it was officially returned to the Sámi people in 2022, according to Jelena Porsanger, director of the museum, following an appeal by Norway's Sámi president to Queen Margrethe of Denmark.

== Literature ==
- Anonymous. (1723) [probably Thomas von Westen] "Underrettning om Rune-Bommens rette Brug iblandt Finnerne i Nordlandene og Finnmarken saaledes, som det har været af Fordum-Tiid". Printed in Just Qvigstad (ed.) Kildeskrifter til den lappiske mythologi; bind 1. Published in the series Det Kongelige Norske Videnskabers Selskabs skrifter 1903. (e-book). pp 65–68
- Birgitta Berglund. "Runebommer, noaider og misjonærer". In: Spor, nr 1, 2004 (pdf)
- Rune Blix Hagen. "Harmløs dissenter eller djevelsk trollmann? Trolldomsprosessen mot samen Anders Poulsen i 1692" In: Historisk tidsskrift; 2002; nr 2/3 (pdf)
- Rolf Kjellström & Håkan Rydving. Den samiska trumman. Nordiska museet, 1988. ISBN 91-7108-289-1
- Roald E. Kristensen. "Samisk religion". In: Guddommelig skjønnhet : kunst i religionene. By Geir Winje et al. Universitetsforlaget, 2012. ISBN 978-82-15-02012-9. Mostly a description of the patterns on the drum mentioned in The Nærøy manuscript
- Åsa Virdi Kroik. Hellre mista sitt huvud än lämna sin trumma. Föreningen Boska, 2007. ISBN 978-91-633-1020-1.
- Sunna Kuoljok and Anna Westman Kuhmunen. Betraktelser av en trumma. Ájtte museums venners småskrift, 2014. Mostly about this drum, which is kept at Ájtte since 2012
- Ernst Manker. Die lappische Zaubertrommel, eine ethnologische Monographie. 2 volumes.
  - 1. Die Trommel als Denkmal materieller Kultur. Thule förlag, 1938 (Nordiska museets series Acta Lapponica; 1)
  - 2. Die Trommel als Urkunde geistigen Lebens. Gebers förlag, 1950 (Nordiska museets series Acta Lapponica; 6)
- Hans Mebius. Bissie, studier i samisk religionshistoria. Jengel förlag, 2007. ISBN 91-88672-05-0
- Leif Pareli. "To kildeskrifter om Bindalstromma". In: Åarjel-saemieh; no 10. 2010.
- Brita Pollan. Samiske sjamaner: religion og helbredelse. Gyldendal, 1993. ISBN 82-05-21558-8. (ebook in bokhylla.no)
- Brita Pollan (ed). Noaidier, historier om samiske sjamaner. XXXIX, 268 p. Bokklubben, 2002. (Verdens Hellige Skrifter; #14). ISBN 82-525-5185-8
- Håkan Rydving. "Ett metodiskt problem och dess lösning: Att tolka sydsamiska trumfigurer med hjälp av trumman från Freavnantjahke". In: Njaarke: tjaalegh Harranen Giesieakademijeste. Edited by Maja Dunfjeld. Harran, 2007. ISBN 978-82-997763-0-1 (Skrifter fra Sommerakademiet på Harran; 1)
- Aage Solbakk. Hva vi tror på : noaidevuohta - en innføring i nordsamenes religion. ČálliidLágádus, 2008. ISBN 978-82-92044-57-5
- Anna Westman. "Den heliga trumman". In: Fordom då alla djur kunde tala... – Samisk tro i förändring. Edited by Åsa Virdi Kroik. Rosima förlag, 2001. ISBN 91-973517-1-7. Also published as: Anna Westman Kuhmunen. "Den heliga trumman". In: Efter förfädernas sed: Om samisk religion. Edited by Åsa Virdi Kroik. Föreningen Boska, 2005. ISBN 91-631-7196-1.
- Anna Westman and John E. Utsi. Trumtid, om samernas trummor och religion = Gáriid áigi: Sámiid dološ gáriid ja oskku birra. Published by Ájtte and Nordiska museet, 1998. 32 p. ISBN 91-87636-13-1.
