= Forest Sami =

Group of Sámi people in northern Sweden

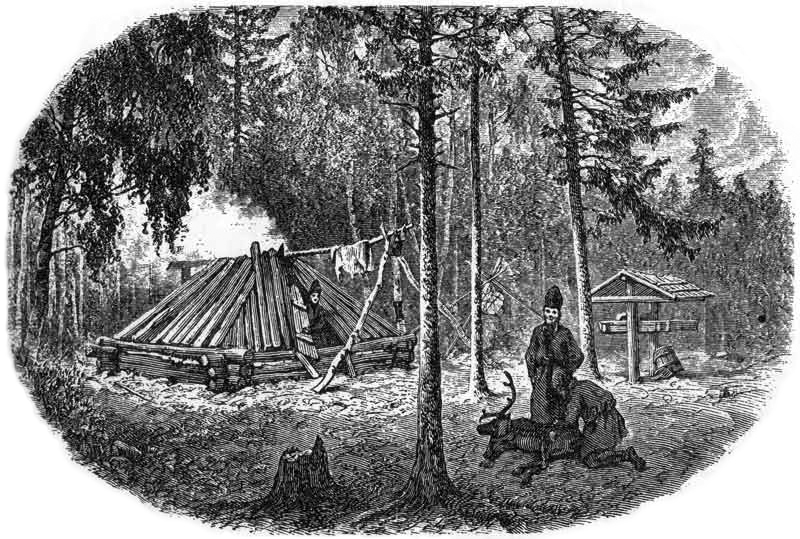
Forest Sami settlement at Spänningsvallen between Järfojaur and Seudnur, designated since 1971 as the Arvidsjaur Municipality. 1873 woodcut based on a photograph.

The forest Sámi (Swedish: Skogssamer) are Sámi people who lived in the woods and who, unlike the reindeer-herding Sámi people (the "fell Sámi"), did not move up into the fells during the summer season. Historically, there have been forest Sámi in Sweden in the area ranging from northern Ångermanland to the far north. In the early 1600s the term granlapp was also used to refer to the Sámi people who paid taxes only to Sweden, compared to the semi-nomadic fell Sámi, who, since they worked in the fells that straddled the Swedish-Norwegian border, had to pay taxes to both countries. When Ernst Manker studied the life of the forest Sámi in the early 20th century, nearly all of their habitations had been abandoned. Only one forest Sámi village remained, in Malå in Västerbotten, an area known as Stenundslandet in Anundsjö. There is a modern-day group who consider themselves forest Sámi in Finland, but they are not part of the Sámi parliament, for example.

== Background ==
Historically, there were forest Sámi in the northern parts of Ångermanland and further north in Sweden. The two southernmost Sámi regions, Åsele and Lycksele, were not inhabited by fell Sámi prior to 1606, but rather only by forest Sámi, as was the Kemi lappmark in modern Finland. The forest Sámi in Kemi, Åsele, and Lycksele became assimilated into Finnish and Swedish society beginning in the 17th century. There are still forest Sámi cultures present in the woods in Norrbotten and in Malå in Västerbotten and in central Lapland of Finland.

== Granlappar ==
By the 1500s, there was already a difference between the forest Sámi and the fell Sámi. The forest Sámi remained in the lowlands in summer, pasturing their reindeer in bogs, while the fell Sámi moved their herds high onto the fells, above the tree line, for summer pasturage. At that time, the forest Sámi were called granlappar (Spruce Lapps). As a result of this cultural divide, the two groups were subject to different forms of taxation. In 1585 Olof Andersson Burman, a government liaison to the Sámi (lappfogde) in Luleå and Piteå, wrote:

De säges vara granlappar som utgöra skatt om året bland vildvaror /,/ fiskeskatt som är gäddor, sik, abborre. Men de andra som ingen fisk ränta förmältes i årliga längden kallas fjällappar, havande det namnet därav att de bo uppe i fjällen uti bergsskrevor, och komma till inga sjöar med mindre deras nabor granlapparna vele godvilligt efterlåta dem fiska med sig. (It is said that granlappar should pay taxes for their hunting and fishing.)

This meant that taxation was based on whether a person was a forest Sámi or part of another Sámi community. In the early 17th century, the term granlapp also referred to Sámi people who were taxed only by Sweden, while the fell Sámi could be taxed in both Sweden and Norway, as the fells in which they grazed their reindeer included land in both countries.

== Forest Sámi villages ==
Due to laws adopted in 1886 about the hunting of reindeer, some villages were established for easier administration of reindeer herding. For example, ten forest Sámi villages near the town of Vittangi used the same name. These were located in Gällivare, Jokkmove, Ståkke, Arjeplog, Malmesjaur, Eastern Kikkejaur, the western parts of Kikkejaur and Mausjaur, and Malå.

In 1956, the Swedish Sámi village in Jokkmokk was dismantled, as reindeer herding was halted in the area. Instead, two separate Sámi villages were established in the southern and northern parts of Jokkmokk.

== Distribution and numbers ==
In Piteå in 1553, 47% of the Sámi population were forest Sámi. In 1555, in Luleå, 73% were taxpaying forest Sámi and 35% other Sámi people. Similar differences in population size between the two groups continued throughout the 16th century.

Petrus Læstadius wrote in his journal in 1827 that the forest Sámi had by that point become fewer than the Sámi people. Nevertheless, he noted that in Arvidsjaur the population were still all forest Sámi, with significant populations also in Arjeplog, Jokkmokk. and Gällivare.

In 1882, a committee was formed to investigate the situation of the Sámi people in Sweden, and further data was made public:

- In Enonstekis, there were two forest Sámi families from Pajala with 600 reindeer.
- In Jukkasjärvi, there were three forest Sámi families with about 500 reindeer.
- In Gällivare, there was a bigger population of forest Sámi at 6,500.
- In Jokkmokk, there were two forest Sámi villages.
- In Arjeplog, there were forest Sámi families who had stopped herding reindeer and started fishing instead.

== Visten ==
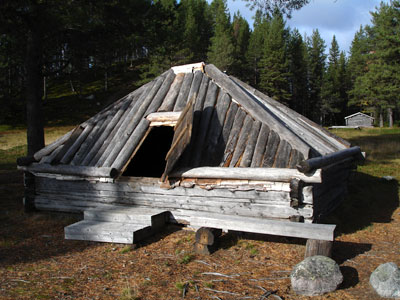
Wood goahti used by forest Sámi at a viste in Koppsele, Malå

Until the early 1900s forest Sámi were spread over large geographic areas, with each household having its own territory. In each territory, there were settlements known as visten, each with a goahti, a Sámi hut or tent. When Ernst Manker studied the forest Sámi during the first decade of the 20th century, almost every viste had been abandoned for abodes that looked more like the homes of the Swedish majority culture: houses and farms.

== Fishing and hunting origin ==
The forest Sámi paid taxes that were different from those paid by the fell Sámi in the 17th century based on their different modes of subsistence. Forest Sámi during this period lived a less nomadic life, since they were less involved with herding reindeer. In the 1670s Samuel Rheen said that the forest Sámi in Jokkmokk lived mostly on hunting and fishing. Nicolaus Lundius reported in the same period from Umeå that the forest Sámi had less money than other Sámi people.

A few forest Sámi were reindeer owners in the 17th century. A protocol issued in 1699 stipulated that Ture Turesson was the owner of 100 reindeer in Rusksele.

== Religion ==
Very little is known about the religious beliefs of the forest Sámi in pre-Christian times. It is known is that they believed in nature spirits, and that meaningful places, such as mountains and lakes, had their own spirit world. The male head of each family used a ceremonial drum to contact that spirit world. There were also noaidis, who were men considered more capable of establishing contact with the spirits. Bears were known to be part of a special cult, and the forest Sámi people had intricate ceremonies revolving around them.

== Languages ==
Most forest Sámi people used Swedish as their main language, but the Sámi languages were also used to a certain degree. In Luleå, both the forest Sámi and other Sámi people also spoke the Lule Sámi language. In Piteå the fell Sámi spoke the Pite Sámi language, while the local forest Sámi spoke mostly Swedish or the Ume Sámi language. The forest Sámi in Malå and eastern Sorsele also spoke Ume Sámi.

In Lycksele and Åsele the forest Sámi were almost entirely assimilated into Swedish society during the 19th century. Their old language was permanently lost. Sámi literature from the 17th and 18th centuries, by Olaus Stephani Graan and Pehr Fjällström, respectively, demonstrate that at that time there were still many speakers of Ume Sámi. The spread of the Ume Sámi language is discussed by J. A. Nensen in the 19th century, when the forest Sámi in Åsöee used a dialect considered a variety of Ume Sámi. Nensen stated that their language was clearly separate from the southern dialect of the Sámi languages, which was used by the other Sámi population in Vilhelmina.

== End of forest Sámi culture ==
With the decline of reindeer herding in large parts of Norrland, the forest Sámi culture almost disappeared, since they no longer continued their traditional lifestyle. In Kemi, Finland, the Finnish forest Sámi for the most part lost their distinct identity and were assimilated into the other Sámi groups, adopting their languages. Similar changes occurred in Åsele and Lycksele during the 18th century.

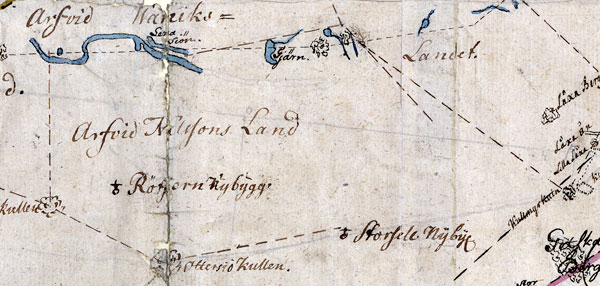
1758 map of Stensundslandet

== Stensundslandet ==
Only one forest Sámi village, Stenundslandet in Malå, survived into the 19th century. Nils Persson (1804–1880) was the last known forest Sámi to continue in the traditional lifestyle. In 1842, Persson received authorization from the municipal leaders to conduct reindeer work, which he continued until his death. The reindeer business was subsequently taken over by his daughter Sara Johanna and her husband Lars Jonsson, but they eventually abandoned the traditional lifestyle.

== See also ==
- Karin Stenberg
