= Beaivi =

Sami sun-deity, name of sun in Sami

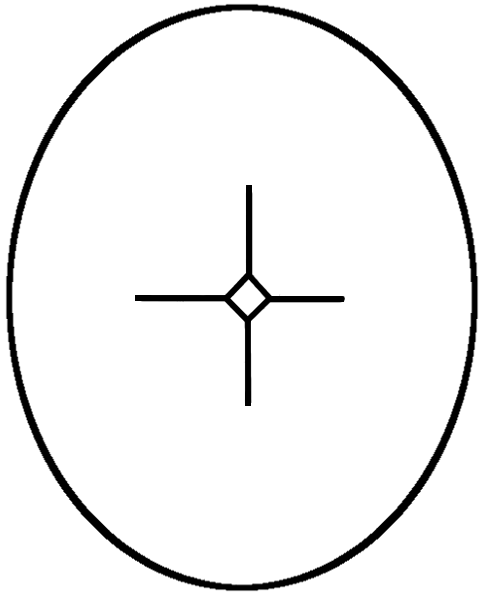
Beivve Sami Sun symbol

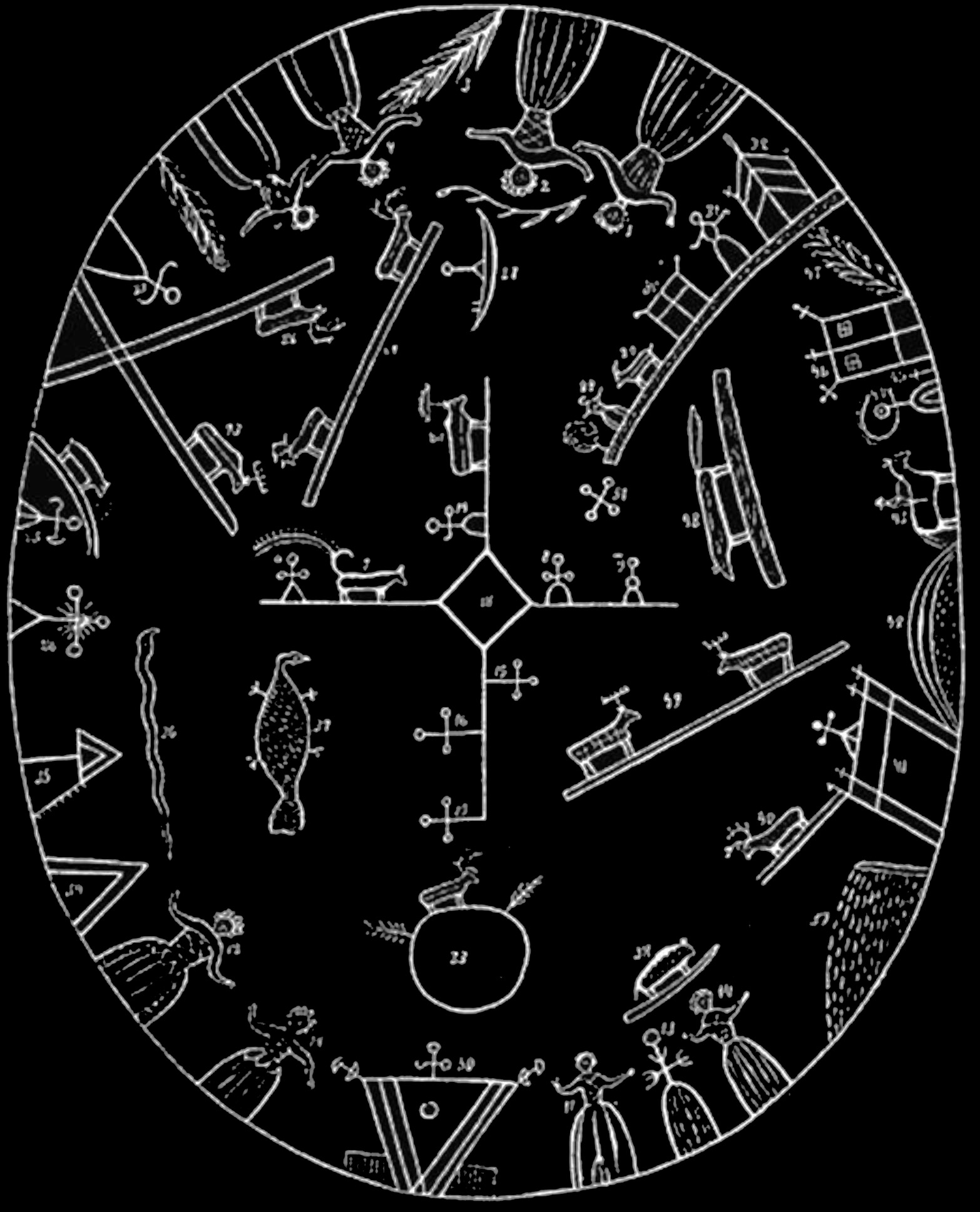
Sami Shaman drum found in Nærøysund Municipality, Norway

Beaivi (other spellings Beiwe, Bievve, Beivve or Biejje, Inari Sami: Piäiváž) is the Sami Sun-deity; the name of the deity is the same as the name of the Sun. In Southern Sápmi, the Sun deity is female, but male for Skolts and in Kola Peninsula. In Sápmi, north of the Polar circle, where the sun does not even reach the horizon in winter, the sun was widely venerated and played a major role in the cultic coherence.

Beaivi is a god of the sun, spring, and sanity, associated with the fertility of plants and animals, particularly reindeer. She made the plants grow so that the reindeer flourished and reproduced, and brought wealth and prosperity to the humans. According to Samuel Rheen, Beaivi was considered the mother of all living things.

== On drums ==
In Northern Sámi drums, the Sun appears as a circle near the top. In Southern Sámi drums, the Sun is a square in the center with four lines spreading out, symbolizing the Sun's power in the main four cardinal directions. The lines are called nealja beaiwe labikje 'four straps of the Sun'.

== Myths ==
As female, she travels with her daughter, Beaivi-nieida, through the sky in an enclosure covered by reindeer bones or antlers, bringing spring with them. As male, he rides with his wife, a Sámi woman, thus forming a relation to humans.

=== Beaivebártni soagŋomátki Jiehtanasaid máilmmis ===
In the epic joik The Son of the Sun's journey to court in the Realm of the Giants (Northern Sami: Beaivebártni soagŋomátki Jiehtanasaid máilmmis), the Son of the Sun travels to the realm of the giants on the other side of the sea and marries the daughter of a giant. Their sons are the Gállábártnit, who invented skiis and were the beginning of humanity. This myth is why the Sámi call themselves children of the Sun.

=== The Taming of Reindeer ===
In a myth written down by Gustaf von Düben, the first humans were two men named Njáveš and Háhčeš. Njáveš married Njávešeatni, the daughter of the Sun, while Háhčeš married Áhčešeatni, the daughter of the Moon. Njávešeatni tamed wild reindeer and gave them to humans, while Áhčešeatni was mean to her own reindeer, causing them to become wild.

A Northern Sámi myth states that the daughter of the Sun taught humans to herd reindeer. According to Eastern Sámi myths, reindeer are owned by the Sun himself, and his daughter the Sun Maiden (Kildin Sami: Piejjv niijjd) got many of them as dowry when she married a reindeer herder. Reindeer herding had already been invented, but this act caused the art to develop further.

== Rituals ==
Beaivi is thought to have been the only god along with Radien-attje who was worshipped by both men and women. In addition, the sacrificial rituals to Beaivi were held on the same large platforms behind the goahti as were the rituals for Horagalles. Christian missionary Sigvard Kildal is said to have burned down over 40 such altars in Ofoten in 1722. Sacrifices were made mainly to ensure sunlight, warmth, fertility, and prosperity of reindeer, but people also turned to Beaivi for help with mental illnesses, summer headaches, and if one got lost.

Sámi of Norway are said to have put a wooden pole with a thorny circle on top next to Beaivi's altar. Another source mentions the symbol of the Sun to have been a large wooden ring decorated with drawings. During sacrifice, these were "anointed" with blood and even the sacrificial animal's bones were set in a circle.

Circle-shaped items were also sacrificed. On the first morning of the new year, it was a custom for the whole family to go to a nearby spring or creek, each of them offering a copper ring. From the brightness of the rings they predicted how lucky the coming year would become. However, this custom could only have existed in Southern Sápmi as in the north, the Sun doesn't rise during New Years.

Animals sacrificed to Beaivi had to female and, if possible, white in colour. White string had to be tied around the animal's ear. In addition to reindeer, sheep and goats were also sacrificed. One piece from each part of the sacrificed animal's body would be threaded onto sticks which were bent into rings. In another description, a small part of the animal's lung, heart, tongue and lip were put into a small ring made of birch branches, while other rings dipped in bood were set above.

At the time of the year when the sun was returning, butter (which melts in the sunshine) was smeared on the doorposts, as a sacrifice to Beivve, so that she could gain strength during her convalescence and go higher and higher in the sky. Prayers were made for the people who were mentally ill. The Sami believed that madness (in the shape of psychoses and depression) were provoked by the lack of sunshine and light during the long, dark winter. In the 20th century, Sámi in Eanodat baked a cake out of flour and reindeer blood and hung it on the branches of a birch as a sacrifice for the Sun at the turn of spring.

At the summer solstice, people made sun-rings out of leaves and pinned them up in her honor. On these occasions, they also ate butter as a sacral meal. In Norway, Sámi ate and sacrificed "sun porridge" during the summer solstice.

== See also ==
- Sami shamanism
- Bieggolmai
- Päivätär (Finnish solar goddess)
- Amaterasu
