= Anders Poulsen =

Anders Poulsen may refer to:

- Anders Poulsen (ice hockey)
- Anders Poulsen (shaman)
