= Bieggolmai =

Sami deity of summer winds and storms

Bieggolmai on Sámi drums.

Bieggolmai (other spellings Bieggaolmmái, Biegolmai, Biegkålmaj, or Bieggålmåj, Kildin Sami: Piiŋk-olma, Skolt Sami: Piõgg-oumaž; lit. 'wind man') or Bieggagállis (other spellings Biegkegaellies or Biegga-galles; lit. 'wind old man') is the god of wind in Sámi shamanism.

He is generally portrayed with two shovels in his hands, which he used to shuffle the winds into and out of his cave. According to Johan Randulf in the Nærøy manuscript, he had a shovel in his right hand to put wind back into his caves after it had blown enough, and a club in his left hand to chase the wind back out to blow. He was asked to ease the blowing of harmful wind to reindeer, as well as calm down storms when in the waters. Henrik Forbus called him a summer god who ruled over air and wind, water and sea. On sun-centered Sámi drums, Bieggolmai resides on one of the sun's rays.

Bieggolmai was among the most important Sámi gods. He could influence the movements of reindeer because reindeer tend to travel into headwind to minimize the number of mosquitoes around. In Inari, Finland, there are the Piegg-oaivadz fells where people used to sacrifice horns to Bieggolmai. Other things which were sacrificed were animals, small boats or even wooden shovels. In Utsjoki, he was also known as Ilmaris, loaned from Finnish Ilmarinen or demonstrating a shared origin for the two figures.

Some researchers, such as Axel Olrik, have connected Bieggolmai to Norse Njörðr. Olrik argued that Bieggolmai's shovel would actually be a paddle, and that Bieggolmai would've originally been a god of sailors. Sámi drums display a trinity of Horagalles, Veralden Olmai and Biegga-galles.

Rafael Karsten called Bieggolmai the unpredictable deity of the summer winds and storms, and Biegkegaellies his winter counterpart.
