= Biejjenniejte =

Deity in Sami shamanism

- Daughter of the Sun
- Other names: Beaivi-nieida, Beaivvi-nieida, Beive-neida, Sola-neide, Piejjv niijjd
- Venerated in: Sámi shamanism
- Gender: Female
- Parents: Beaivi

Biejjenniejte (also Beaivi-nieida, Beive-neida, Sola-neide, Kildin Sami: Piejjv niijjd) 'Daughter of the Sun' or 'Sun Maiden', is a deity in Sami shamanism.

She is the goddess of medicine and healing. She is the daughter of the sun deity Beaivi. She is particularly helpful towards illnesses caused by the Sun.

== Myths ==
A Northern Sámi myth states that the daughter of the Sun taught humans to herd reindeer. According to Eastern Sámi myths, reindeer are owned by the Sun himself, and his daughter got many of them as dowry when she married a reindeer herder, thus improving the art of reindeer herding.

=== Njávešeatni and Áhčešeatni ===
In a myth written down by Gustaf von Düben, the first humans were two men named Njáveš and Háhčeš. Njáveš married Njávešeatni, the daughter of the Sun, while Háhčeš married Áhčešeatni, the daughter of the Moon. As both were pregnant, their husbands got murdered. Njávešeatni tamed wild reindeer and gave them to humans, while Áhčešeatni was mean to her own reindeer, causing them to become wild. Njávešeatni gave birth to a son and Áhčešeatni to a daughter, but once when picking berries they decided to compete: whomever filled their bucket with berries first won the son for herself. Áhčešeatni won by cheating and took the boy.

Much later, Njávešeatni's son happened to run into his mother's goahti and found out the truth of who his real mother is. He killed the treacherous Áhčešeatni, and her reindeer turned into frogs, toads, and harmful animals.
