= Ceremonial drum =

Drums used in ritual events

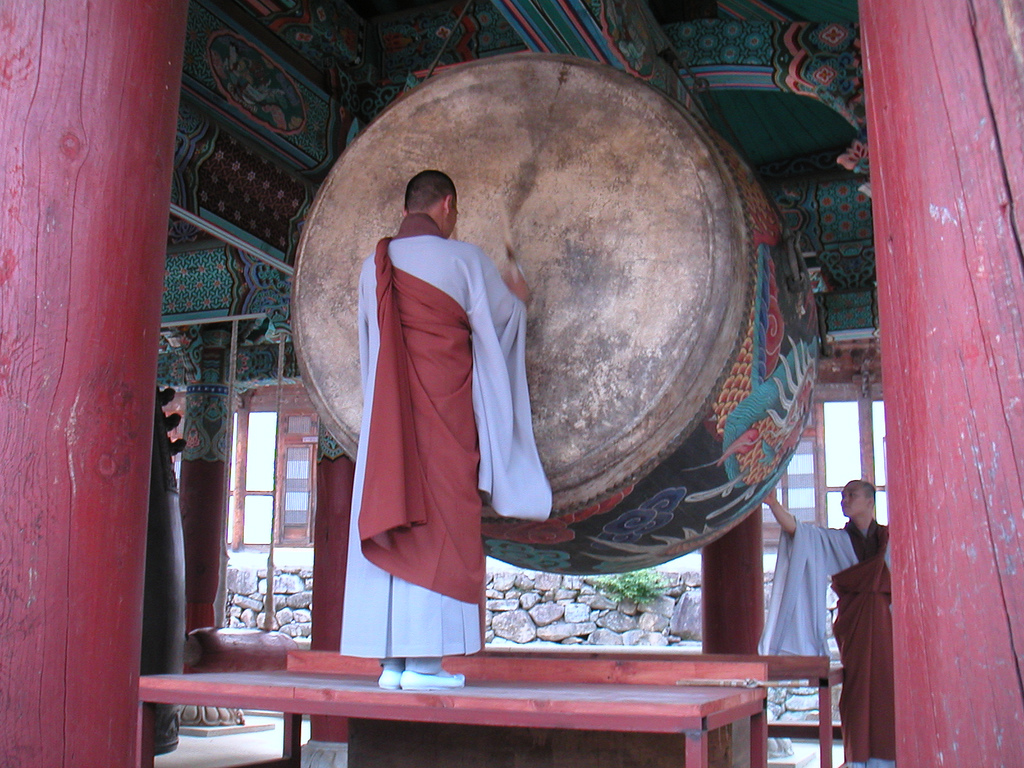
Buddhist monks in Haeinsa Temple in South Korea beat the drum beopgo .

Ceremonial drums are membranophones and idiophonic slit drums, which are played in a ritual context cult, religious or ceremonial social occasions by indigenous peoples around the world, often accompanied by singing or chanting.

Some ceremonial drums were specially made for their purpose and are accordingly elaborately designed. This includes drums, which are considered sacred objects and may only be used by a certain group of people. The drums can be played solo or in a small ensemble to accompany singing in rituals, or can belong to a larger orchestra for courtly ceremonies and plays. Ceremonial drums can include tubular drums standing upright on the floor, large kettle drums, hand-held frame drums, and wooden slit drums.

== Distribution ==
=== Africa ===
In Sub-Saharan Africa, certain drums are only used in secret-society ceremonies or initiations. The Ewe in the south of Ghana use a ceremonial drum orchestra that performs at funerals or to worship deities of traditional religion. The gankogui double-stemmed bell sets the pace. Almost each of the orishas revered in the Yoruba religion has its own drum orchestra, which is of central importance for the cult of the respective deity. Drum music also represents the medium through which the ritual participant in ecstasy get in touch with the gods. The drums played at religious ceremonies of the Yoruba are tubular drums that are open at the bottom and are covered with fur on one side. In the case of the Yoruba's ìgbìn drum, its wooden body stands on carved feet. According to tradition, these drums were once human beings before the Orishas brought them to earth.

The palace music played by traditional African rulers at court ceremonies includes drums and wind instruments; in northern Nigeria, for example, the cylinder drum gangan, the long trumpet kakaki and the cone oboe algaita. Kettle drums used in ceremonial court music in northern Africa can be traced back in individual cases to Arab influence and the naqqara kettle-drum pair, played in Islamic military bands and palace orchestras. This influence also applies to the long African metal trumpets, which are derived from the Arabic nafīr or the karnay. Ceremonial drums are often an indispensable part of the insignia of the ruler, without whose possession and ritual use he cannot be introduced into his office. According to a 1930 era description about the inauguration of the local May (ruler) of Fika, Nigeria, the superordinate Hausa Madaiki (leader) takes the small "successor drum" into the palace and carries it hidden under his cloak into his house. On the evening after the funeral, the Madaiki brings the snare drum and a large ceremonial drum into the palace, appoints the successor and installs him immediately in his office. When May beats the metal kettle drum three times and the Madaiki once, the inauguration ceremony is over and May is the deceased's legal successor.

=== Middle East and India ===
The naqqara was part of the courtly ceremonial music naubat from the Middle East to India . The ceremonial orchestra was only allowed to act on the instructions of the ruler. A sign of her special power was that Nur Jahan (1577–1645), wife of the Indian mogul Jahangir, was allowed to play the ceremonial drum even in the presence of her husband.

=== Far North ===
In the circumpolar regions the drums have been classified by traits such as the knob, frame design, size, membrane motifs, ornaments, etc. There are therefore two main groups of drums: those with internal and those with external knobs.

Drums with internal knobs are found amongst the Tjuktjer in Asia and among North American Inuit.

Drums with external knobs are more widespread and are divided into four types:

- West Siberian: (Khant, Mansi, Nenets)
- South Siberian: (groups living above and in the mid regions of the Yenisei River). This type has many variations (Sajano-Yeniseic, Sjoric, Altaic)
- Mid Siberian: This type has two variants, Evenki-Yakutic and Nganasans-Entsic.
- Middle East: (the Nanai, Udegeyians, Ulchians, Nivkhians, Ainu, Evenkians, Buryatsians, Yukagirians, Dolganians, Orochs, Orokians, Negidalians and Zabaykalska Evenkians, that is Evenkians from the region far Lake Baikal, where two types are characteristic: Amursic and Zabaykalic)

The shaman's drums used in cults in northern regions are mostly circular single-headed frame drums.

The historical Saami drum, sometimes termed rune drum, belonged to the South Siberian kind, Sajano-Yeniseic subtype. (Those are, however, very similar to the Sjoric subtypes.) The Sami word for drum is 'goavddis', 'goabdes ' or 'gievrie' and the Altaic term is 'komus'. The Sami drum-stick term is 'bállin'; the Altaic term is 'orba'.

Some North American Indians instead use rattle drums, kettle drums, and occasionally water drums for shamanic and other magical practices.

The drums of the North American Indians are typically large, double-sided frame drums or cylinder drums. In the past, they were generally considered sacred and were not allowed to be played by everyone. The particularly revered "hanging" drum, a frame drum set up horizontally with four bars attached to the side, was kept by a "drum guard" among the Shoshone. Today, at the Powwow, a social gathering lasting several days, large cylinder drums are used in addition to flat drums, which are placed directly on the floor and beaten by several men sitting on chairs in the vicinity to accompany the singing. An example of a ceremony at the Potlatch Festival is the necromancy dance (Coast Salish Winter Dance ) of the coastal Salish on the Northwest American Pacific coast, in which male participants usually accompany drumming and singing at a fireplace at night, one after the other, made-up and costumed dancers.

=== Southeast Asia ===
Slit drums in New Guinea appear in the form of a reclining human on the Sepik and on the Admiralty Islands, with a handle at one end representing the head and a handle at the opposite end representing the legs. In other regions, anthropomorphic slit drums are set up like statues. At the initiation on Sepik, the boys have to crawl into a woven tubular basket that is supposed to represent a crocodile, which devours the boys in a symbolic, dramatic action. In this conical tube they are carried around the ceremonial drums.

== Some examples ==
=== Tubular drums ===
- The bekiviro is an almost man-high goblet drum made from a tree trunk, which is used on a few small islands off the northwest coast of Madagascar in a cult to worship the royal ancestors.
- Beopgo is a large barrel drum that Buddhist monks in Korea beat with mallets during religious ceremonies outdoors. The drums are set up in their own pavilion on the temple grounds. The body, covered with cowhide, is brightly painted with kites flying on clouds. Large barrel drums are generally part of the daily ceremonies in Buddhist temples in East Asia and on special feast days. In Japan these drums are called taiko.
- The damaru is a small two-headed hourglass drum that has been traditionally made from the tops of two (human) skulls, for use in Tibetan ritual music. In India, wooden damaru are part of Hindu ceremonies.
- Ìgbìn is a simple cylinder drum made from a section of trunk of the Yoruba tree in Nigeria, the skin of which is stretched with wooden pegs. The sacred drum used in the Orisha cult stands on three feet, roughly carved out at the bottom. The three different sizes of the ìgbìn are struck with sticks, the largest shape with one hand and a stick.
- The two-skinned barrel drum kebero is used on holidays in the liturgy of the Ethiopian Orthodox Church.
- The Pechiche kettle drum is an approximately 1.2 meter long, slender cylinder drum covered on one side with fur, whose origin is in southern Africa and which occurs exclusively in the village of San Basilio de Palenque in Colombia. There she is beaten in the Cabildo Lumbalú according to African tradition to accompany funeral songs. The Lumbalú group is the only remaining social organization (cabildo) in Colombia from the Spanish colonial era, which comes together for this purpose.
- Pliéwo is a tubular drum in human form placed on the ground among the West African Senufo. The drum, which is covered on one side with fur, is carved out of a trunk section and consists of a bulbous body, which is decorated with formalized human and animal figures in high relief, and a base. In the case of a copy acquired in 1930, this shows a female figure crouching on a stool, who supports the body with her head and both hands raised. The drum was probably used at funeral ceremonies in the association of the sandogo(an authoritative women's society of the Senufo people), to which only women belong (a parallel institution to the men's association poro).
- In addition to ceremonies in Buddhist temples in Japan, the great taiko is also used in concert at international performances. In the Middle Ages it was a samurai war drum.
- The yak bera (Sinhalese “demon drum”) or magul bera (“ceremonial drum”) is a double-skinned long cylinder drum used by Sinhalese in Sri Lanka for Buddhist rituals, private possession ceremonies and the kolam ritual mask theater.

=== Kettle drums ===
- Kultrún is a small, flat kettle drum that Mapuche use for shamanic practices on the southwest coast of South America. It is one of the few musical instruments preserved from before the Spanish conquest in the 16th century.
- Lilissu was the name of a sacred kettle drum usually made of bronze in Mesopotamia, which dates from the beginning of the 2nd millennium BC. It was used until around 300 BC, being beaten by priests in a sacrificial cult.
- The nagra of the Garo in northeastern India has a large semicircular body made of baked clay. It may only be beaten by the village head for ceremonial signaling and only kept in his house.
- The negarit, a large kettle drum made of wood or metal, was the war and ceremonial drum of the Ethiopian emperors, which was struck during proclamations and, mounted on the back of a horse, preceded the emperor when traveling. Its name is related to the oriental naqqara, but did not play with metal trumpets and cone oboes.

=== Frame drums ===
- Qilaut or qila is a large frame drum with a short handle in Greenland and in the Inuit culture of Canada, which was formerly used as a shaman's drum and which is still accompanied by entertainment songs and played at festivals today.
- Tof is the word that occurs several times in the Old Testament for hand drums, which in ancient times were often beaten by women for religious ceremonies and secular occasions. Frame drums were also part of the ceremonies of the Greek Dionysus cult, the Cybele cult, the mystery cult of the Egyptian goddess Isis and the Syrian Dea Syria.
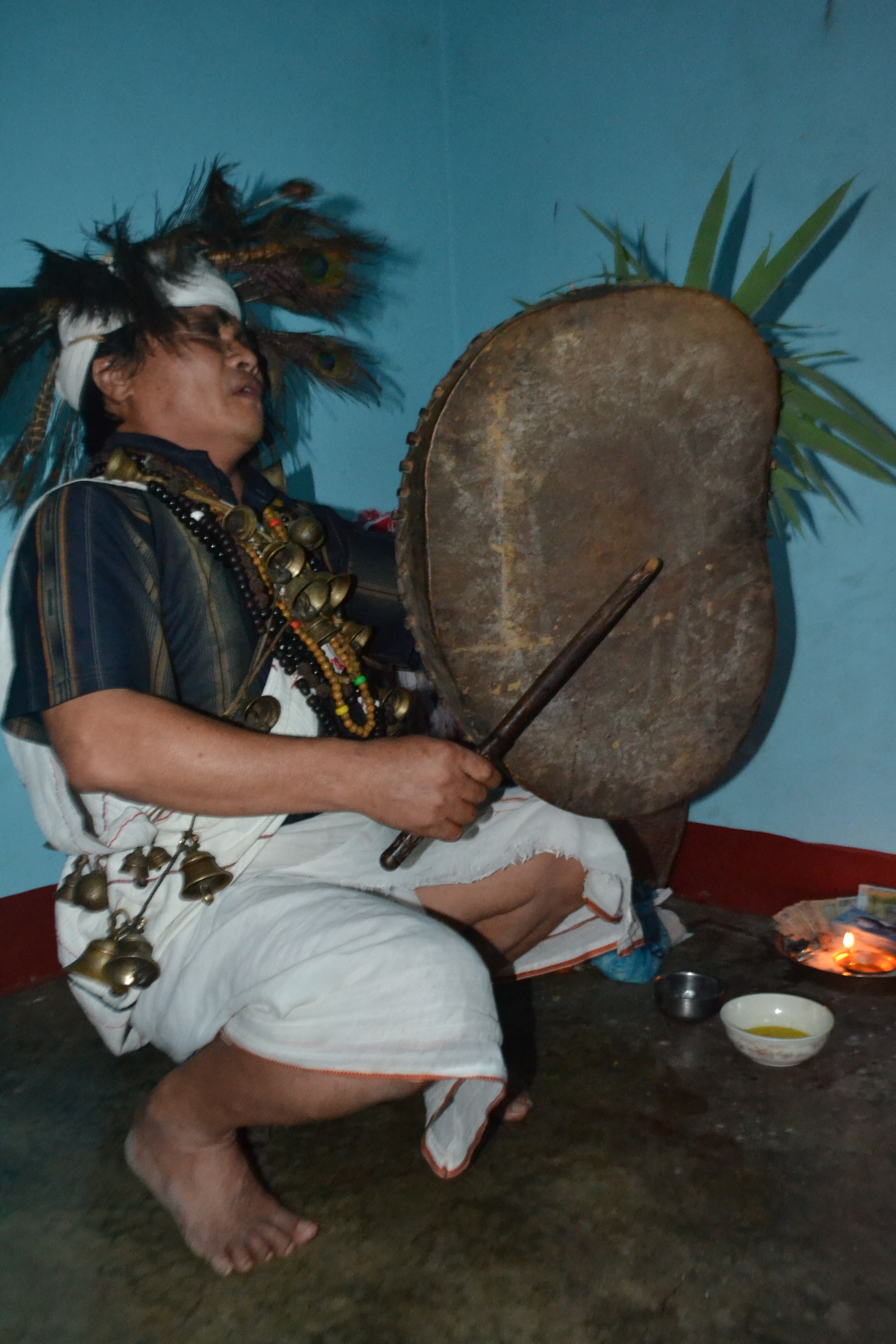
Magar shaman, Nepal

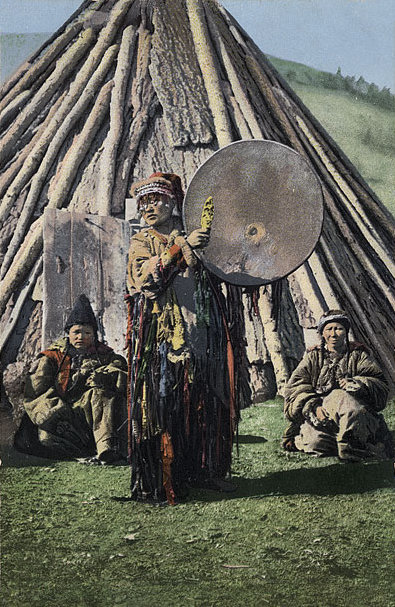
Altai or Khakas shaman with a frame drum.

=== Slotted drums ===
- Garamut is a large ceremonial drum in the form of a wooden slit drum that is used in New Guinea's ritual music, to accompany songs and dances at village festivals (pidgin: Sing-sing) and as a news drum. A garamut is considered a sacred instrument, its production in a remote place is carried out according to traditional rules.
- Okha is a large Edo log drum in southwestern Nigeria that is used in ceremonies. Its counterpart is the somewhat smaller ogidigbo, beaten for entertainment.

== See also ==
- Ceremonial Drum of the Senufo People
- Sámi drum
