= Ájtte =

Museum in Jokkmokk, Sweden

Coordinates: 66°36′12″N 19°59′33″E

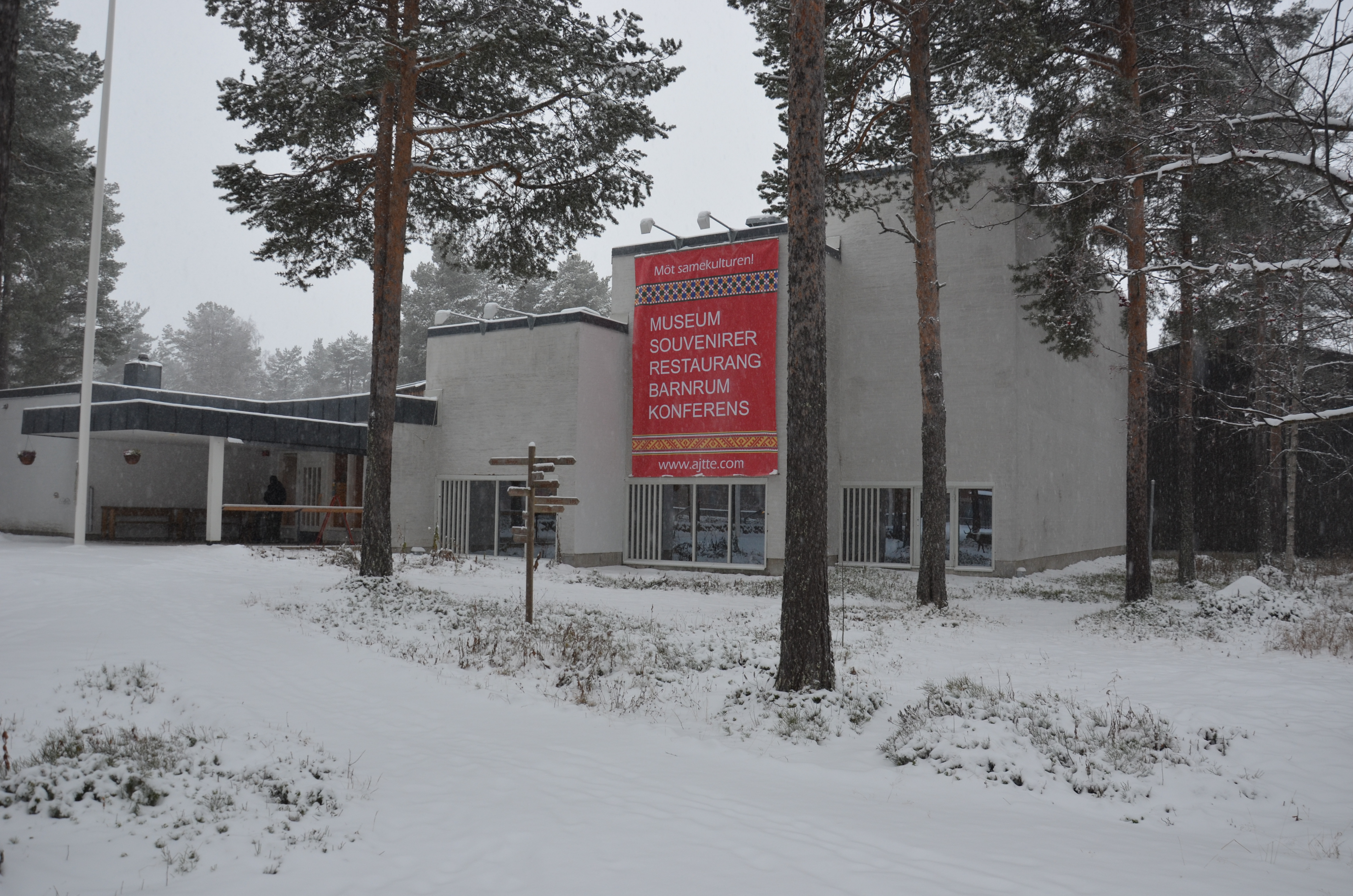
Entrance of Ájtte

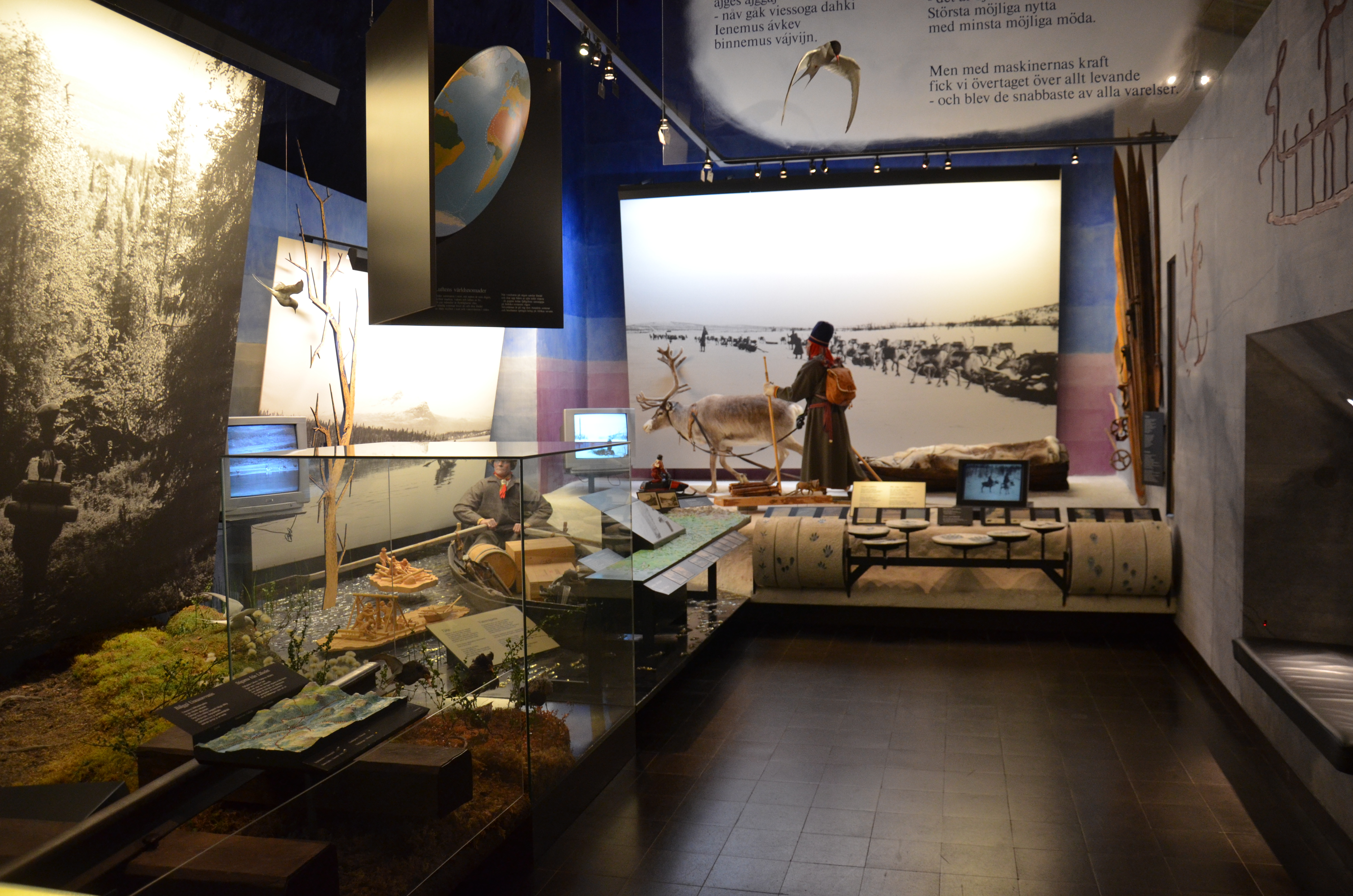
Permanent exhibition on the life of Sami nomads

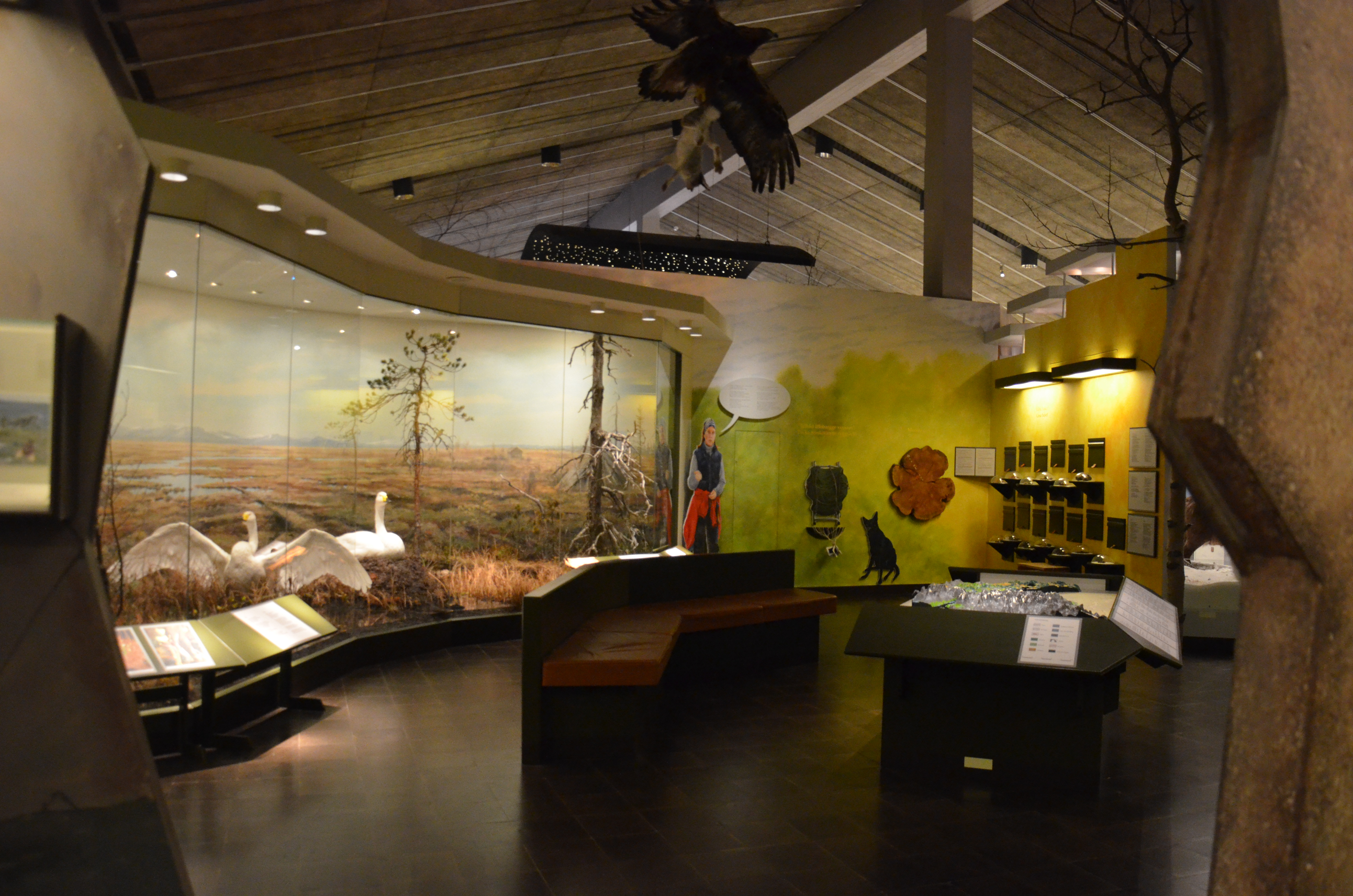
Diorama

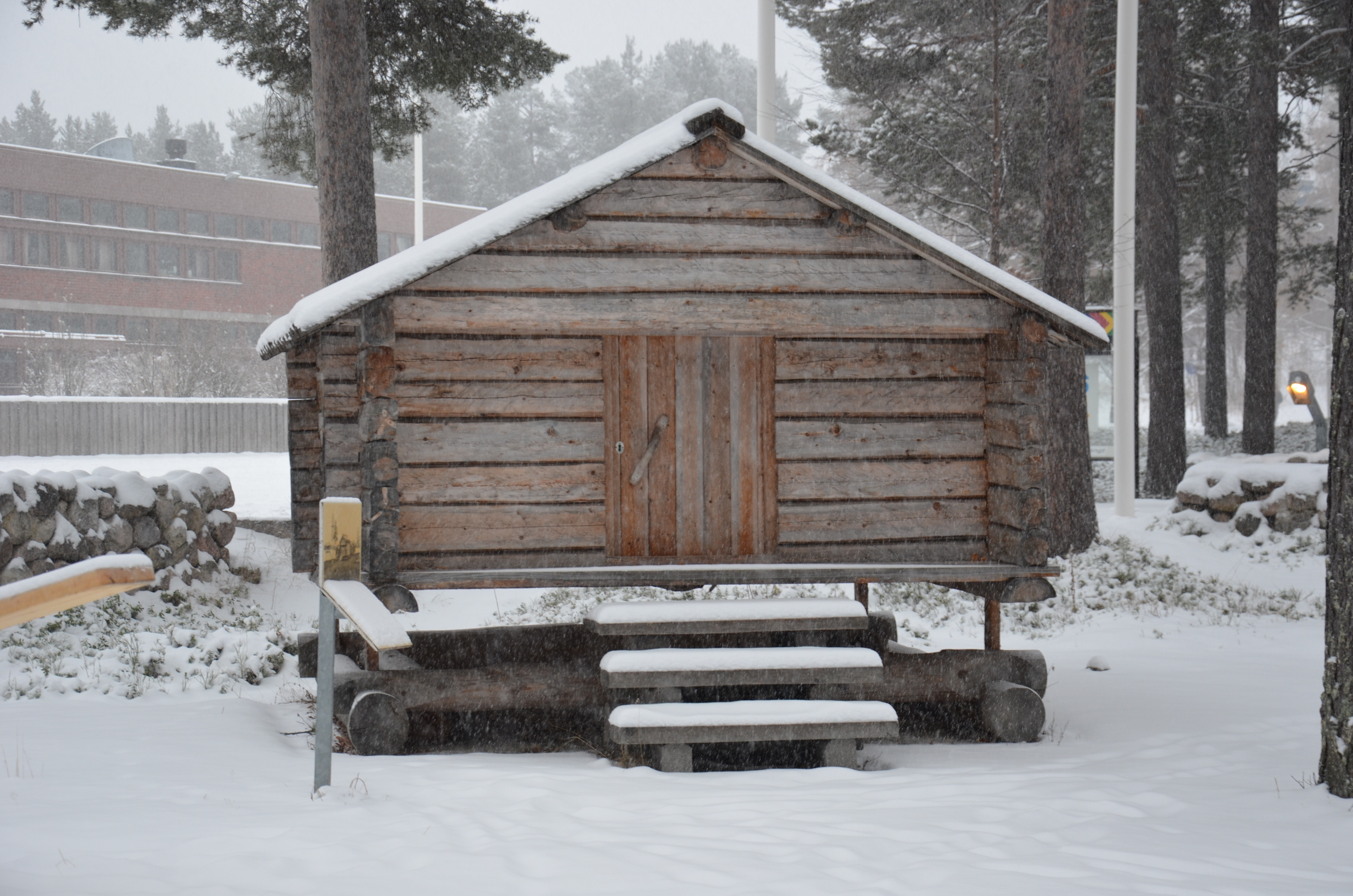
A storage hut (ájtte in the Lule Sami language) in front of the museum

Ájtte, the Swedish Mountain and Sami Museum (Swedish: Svenskt fjäll- och samemuseum), is a cultural and natural history museum in Jokkmokk in Lapland, Sweden.

Ájtte is a museum, which specializes in the culture and nature of the mountainous area of Northern Sweden, and which is also the main museum and archive for the Sami culture of Sweden. Ájtte is also an information centre for tourism in Lapland. The word ájtte is a Lule Sami language one, meaning storage hut and referring to the museum as an archive for artifacts of the Sami cultural heritage.

Ájtte was inaugurated in June 1989 and has a staff of about 25 employees. The museum is owned and managed by a foundation, which was established in 1983 by the Swedish Government, the Norrbotten Region, the Jokkmokk Municipality and the two national Sami organizations Svenska Samernas Riksförbund (National Union of Swedish Sami people) and Same Ätnam (Sami land). According to an agreement on financing of the museum, which was entered into the same year, the Government bodies commit themselves to a long term financial contribution to the museum. Such funds are the result of a court decision regarding compensation after rivers in Lapland have been exploited for electric power generation. The Swedish government appoints the chairman and three of the members of the board of the foundation. Thus, government funds cover around half of the current budget of the museum.

== Jokkmokk Alpine Garden ==
Since 1995 Ájtte has established an alpine botanical garden at the valley of Kvarnbäcken in Jokkmokk with plants from different environments of the mountain range of Northern Scandinavia. One of the century-old researcher cottages from Sarek National Park, designed and used by the pioneering scientist Axel Hamberg, has been dismantled and moved from Sarek and reerected in the botanical garden.
