= Ernst Manker =

Swedish ethnographer

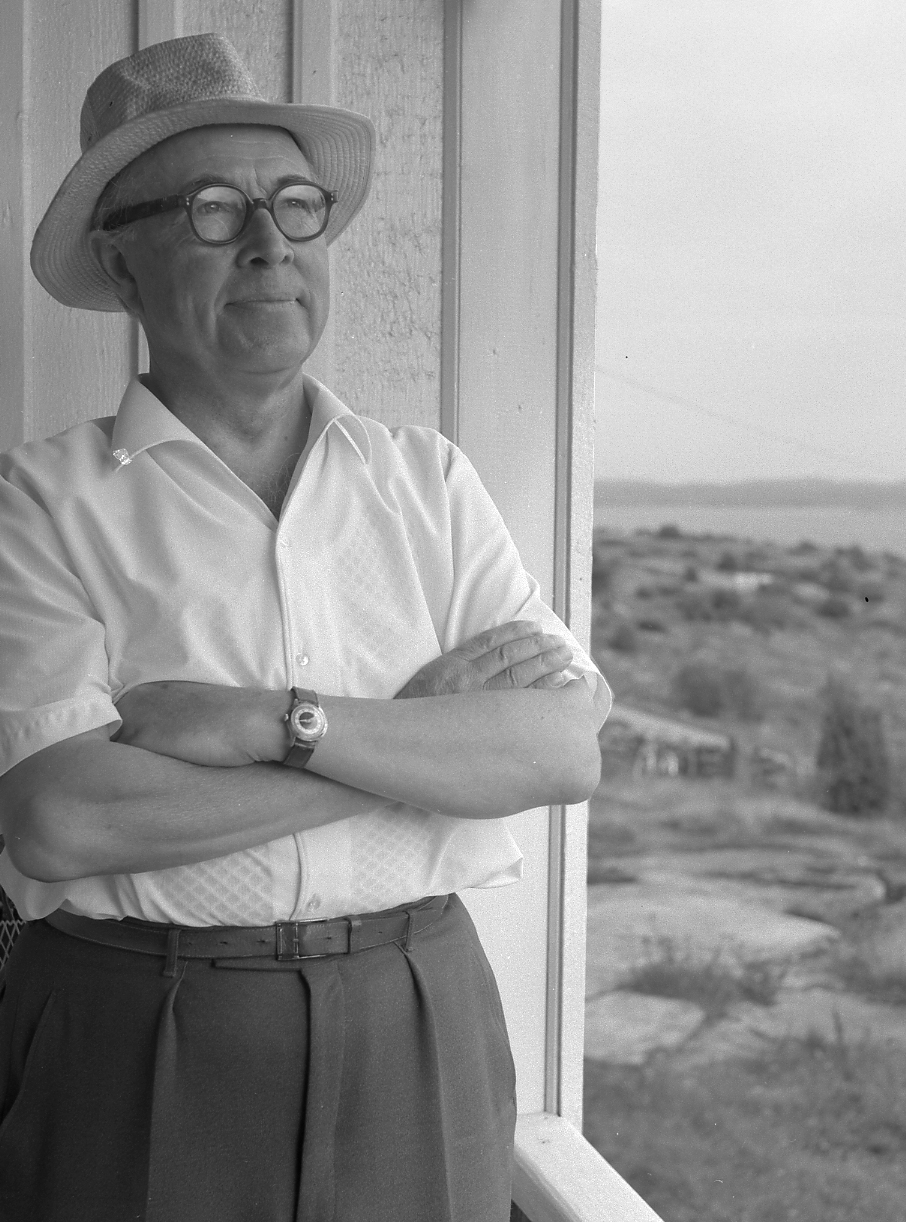
Ernst Manker, Tjörn 1961

Ernst Mauritz Manker (20 March 1893 – 1 February 1972) was a Swedish ethnographer, known for his work on Sami history and ethnography.

Manker was born in Tjörn; his father was a sea captain and a farmer. He earned his fil. kand. in 1924 from the University of Gothenburg with a major in ethnography. His first job was at the Museum of Ethnography in Stockholm, where he studied African cultures and wrote Kristallbergens folk (1929).

After travels in Sami districts in the 1920s, especially a trek in 1926, he focussed on Sami history. When a Sami section was established at the Nordic Museum in 1939, he became its first director. By then, he was already working on his major work on Sami drums, Die lappische Zaubertrommel (2 volumes, 1938 and 1950). He also wrote The nomadism of the Swedish mountain Lapps (1953), Lapparnas heliga ställen (1957), and Fångstgropar och stalotomter (1960). After his retirement in 1961, he published Kvarnarna på Tjörn och den uppländska skenkvarnen (1966) and a number of articles about Tjörn.

Manker was chairman of Svenska fjällklubben from 1949 to 1958, and became a member of the Finno-Ugrian Society in 1942 and of the Royal Skyttean Society in 1956. In 1947 he was made an honorary member of the Royal Anthropological Institute. He was awarded an honorary doctorate by the Stockholm University in 1953, the Qvigstad Medal by Tromsø Museum in 1967, and the Dag Hammarkjöld medal by Svenska Turistföreningen in 1967. He was awarded both the Order of Vasa and the Order of Orange-Nassau.

Manker married Lea Kristina Jansson in 1933. Their son Jan Manker is an artist. He died in Stockholm in 1972.
