= Nærøy manuscript =

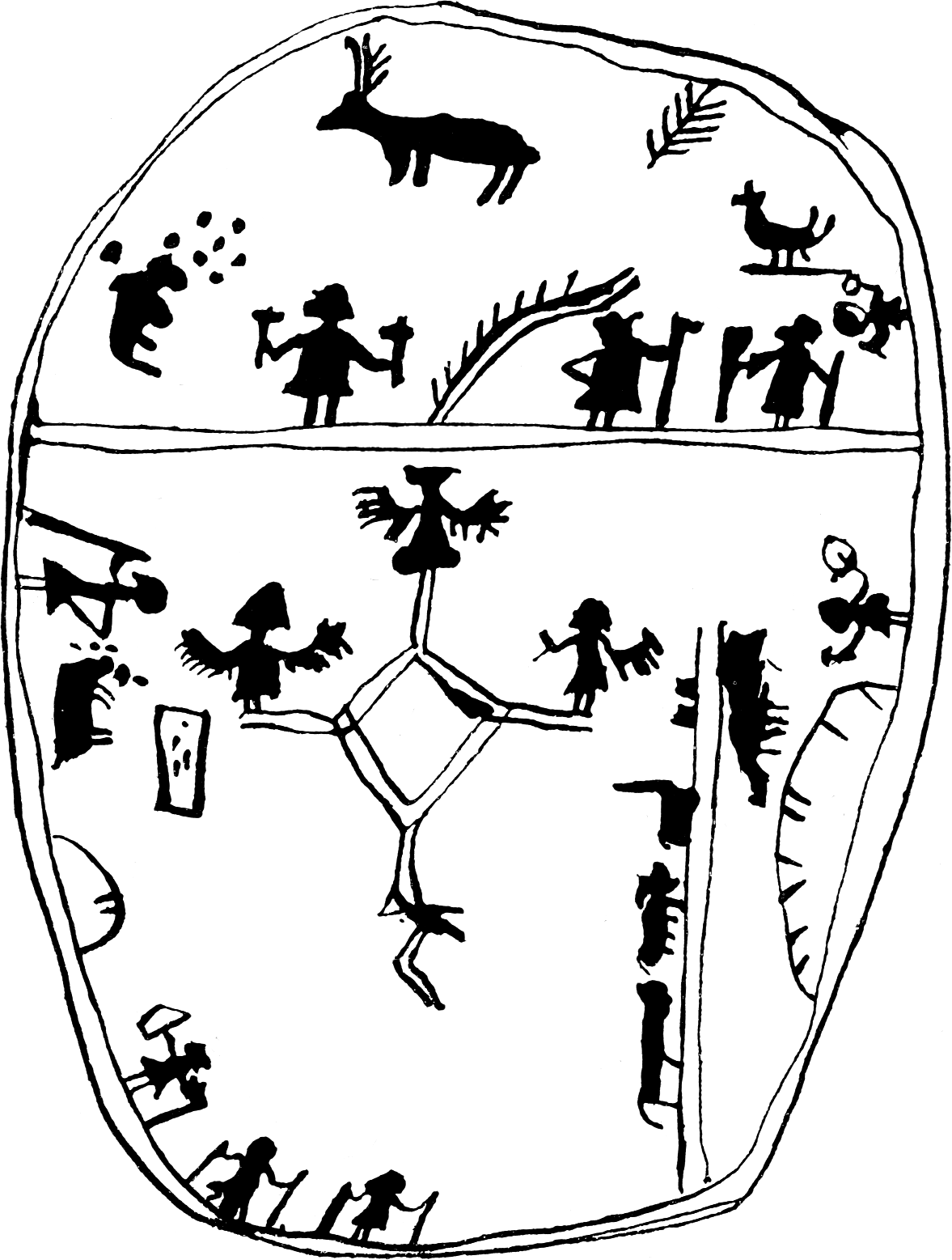
This is the oldest skretch of the sami drum described in the manuscript; possibly drawn by Thomas von Westen. There is also a newer, more styled drawing.

The Nærøy manuscript (Norwegian: Nærøymanuskriptet), originally Relation anlangende Find-Lappernis saa-vel i Norrlandene og Finmarken som udi Nummedalen, Snaasen og Selbye deres Afguderie og’ Satans Dyrkelse, som Tid efter anden ere blevne udforskede og decouvrerede [Treatise on the Sami in Nordland and Finnmark as well as in Namdal, Snåsa and Selbu, their idolatry and worship of Satan, as it has been revealed], is a 1723 treatise by Johan Randulf, then a vicar at Nærøy Church. Randulf writes about Sami missionary Thomas von Westen's visit to the Nærøy parish in January 1723. Randulf and von Westen summoned the Sami people of the parish to be interviewed and taught at the vicarage of Nærøy Church.

The treatise is considered an important source on Sami religion, as Randulf builds his description on his own observations in a geographically defined area. Yet, Randulf is sometimes inaccurate about when he describes his own observations and when he refers to von Westen's observations from other districts.

== Treatise ==
Randulf found there were mountains throughout Namdalen and Helgeland that were considered holy by the Sami. These included holy mountains on the coast, such as Heilhornet (in the present-day Bindal Municipality) and Lekamøya (in Leka Municipality). Randulf names three locations for sacrifices: Teplingfjellet near Foldereid (in present-day Nærøysund Municipality), Folldalen north of Høylandet (in Høylandet Municipality) and Kvernvassfjellet near Mjøsundvatnet (on the border of Nærøysund Municipality and Namsos Municipality).

Randulf makes a distinction between the sea Sami people («Søe-Finner») and the mountain Sami («Field-Finner»), and describes them as having different ways of living and making a living. Unlike the Norwegians the sea Sami had no taboos against horse meat.

Thomas von Westen owned a Sami drum of an Ume Sami type, with one dividing, horizontal line and with a sun symbol in the lower part. The treatise describes and interprets the symbols of the drum.

== Edition ==
A copy of the original manuscript is kept at the Gunnerus Library, Trondheim. It was published by Just Qvigstad in Kildeskrifter til den lappiske mythologi; bind 1; in the series Det Kongelige Norske Videnskabers Selskabs skrifter (1903).
