= Anders Paulsen =

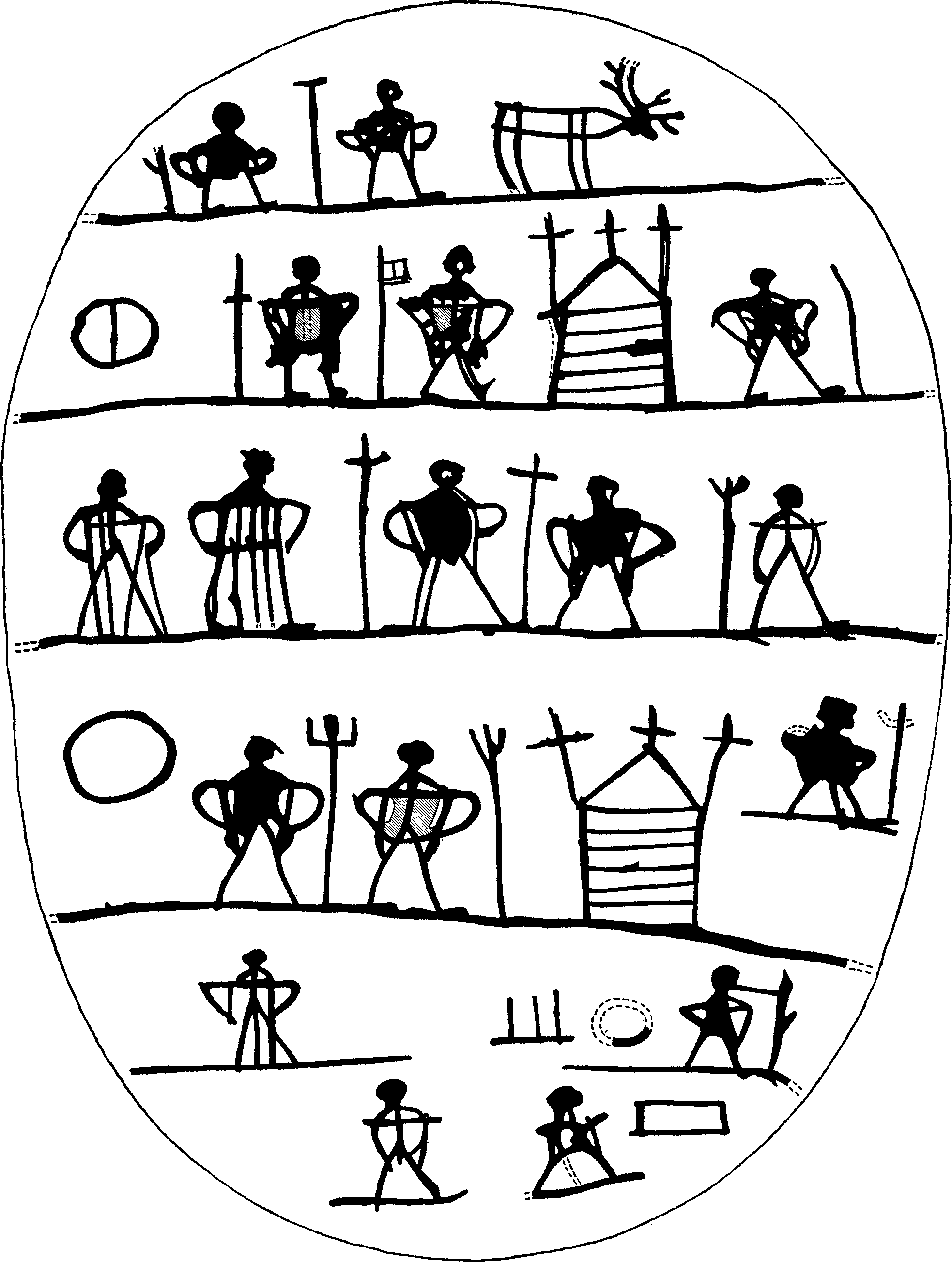
Anders Poulsen's Sámi drum.

Anders Poulsen or Poala-Ánde (in Northern Sámi; died 1692), was a North Sami noaidi, who was the last victim of the many Vardø witch trials, which took place between 1621 and 1692. In Sámi form his name was Poala-Ánde.

== Life ==
He was born in Torne Lappmark in Sweden, but later married and moved to Varanger in Norway. He was active as a noaidi, and as such used a Sámi drum.

The drum was taken from him by force on 7 December 1691, as part of the Christianization of the Sámi people in Norway during the 17th-century. Paulsen was then put on trial for idolatry, and for being a follower of the Pagan Sami shamanism religion. The law used to persecute him was however formally the witchcraft law. Poulsen explained the drum's use during his trial in February 1692.

The case was considered significant and the local authorities sent a request to Copenhagen in Denmark (Norway and Denmark was in a personal union at the time) about how to deal with it. Before a sentence could be reached, however, he was killed by his guard, who was later found to be legally insane.

== Drum ==
Poulsen's drum was sent to Denmark after his death, and became part of the Danish-Norwegian Royal Collection and eventually entered the collections of the National Museum of Denmark. It was on loan to the Sámi Museum in Karasjok, Northern Norway from 1979 but it took "a 40-year struggle" for it to be officially "handed back to the Sámi people" in 2022, according to Jelena Porsanger, director of the museum, following an appeal by the President of the Sámi Parliament of Norway to Queen Margrethe II of Denmark.
