= K. B. Wiklund =

Swedish professor (1868–1934)

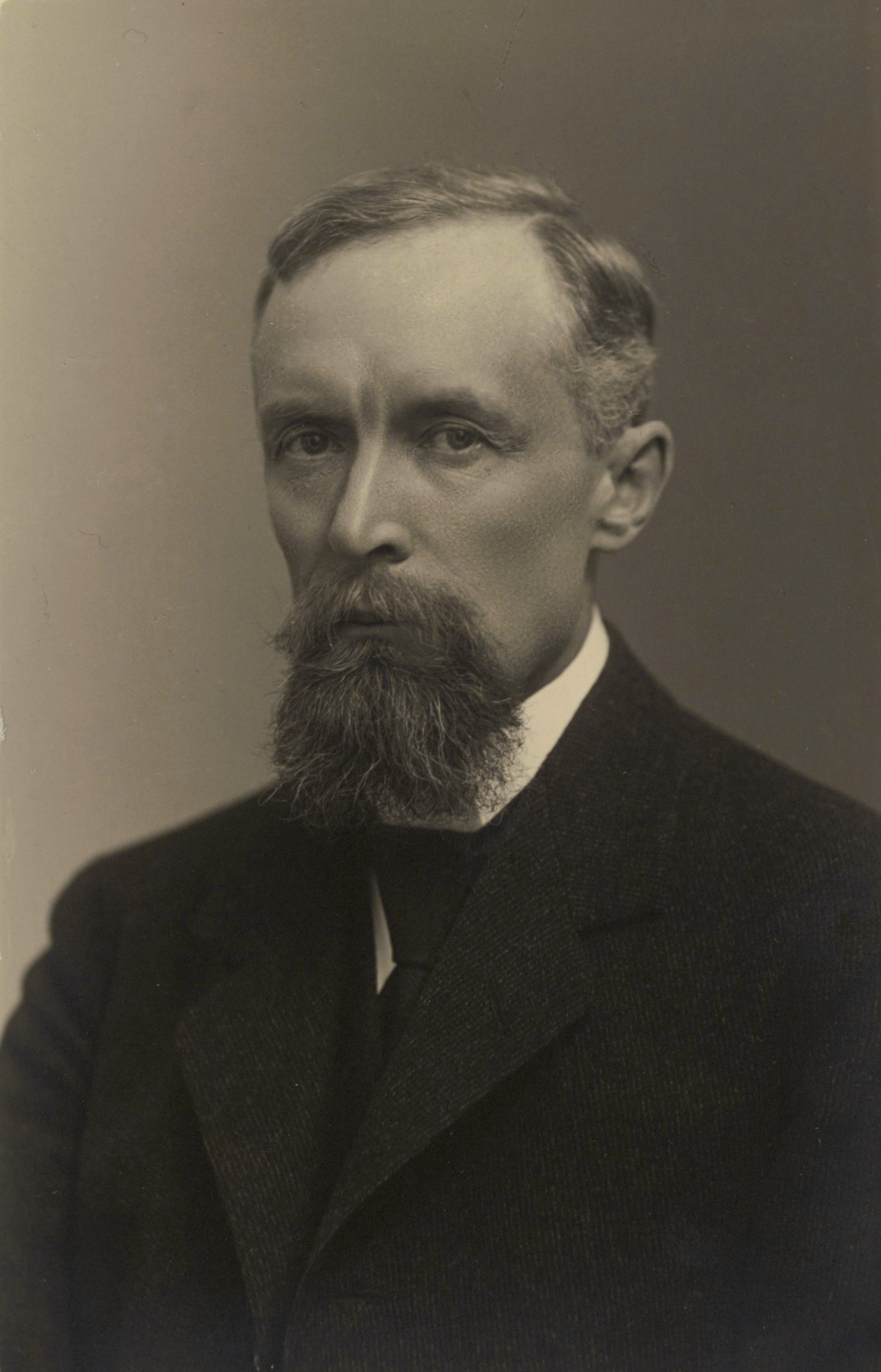
Karl Bernhard Wiklund (1868–1934)

Karl Bernhard Wiklund (15 March 1868 – 1934) was a professor in Finno-Ugric languages at Uppsala Universitet 1905–1933. His research were mainly in Sami languages, and he published several studies in Lule Sami language. He also made several studies in Sami ethnography and wrote school books in Sami, such as Nomadskolans läsebok.

He became a member of the Royal Swedish Academy of Sciences in 1930.

== Bibliography ==
selected

- Lule-lappisches Wörterbuch (1890) Reprinted 1969
- Laut- und Formenlehre der Lule-lappischen Dialekten (1891)
- Entwurf einer urlappischen Lautlehre (1896) PhD thesis
- Lärobok i lapska språket (1901) New edition 1915
- With Just Qvigstad: Dokumenter angaaende flytlapperne m.m., samlede efter renbeitekommissionens opdrag. Bind 2–4. Renbeitekommissionen af 1907. Kristiania [i.e. Oslo] 1909.
- Om lapparna i Sverige (1910) (pdf)
- Olof Rudbeck d.ä och lapptrummorna (1930)
- Lappar i nordligaste Sverige. (1937)
