= Samuel Rheen =

Swedish priest

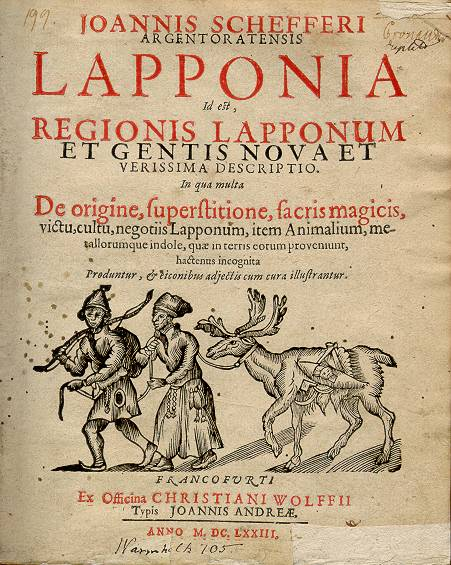
Title page of Lapponia

Samuel Rheen (c. 1615 – 1680) was a Swedish priest, known for the work En kortt Relation om Lapparnes Lefwarne och Sedher, wijdskiepellsser, sampt i många Stycken Grofwe wildfarellsser [A brief treatise of the life and culture of the Sami, and their superstitions] (1671), being one of the earliest descriptions of Sami mythology and Sami noaidi.

He grew up in Böle in Piteå and worked as a minister in Jokkmokk 1664/6-1671 and then in Råneå in Luleå until 1680.

His treatise was commissioned by the government as a part of a larger work describing the life and faith of the Sami. Together with other, similar "clergy correspondences", it served as a source for Johannes Schefferus and his book Lapponia in 1673. His treatise contained a drawing of a sami drum, with explanations of the symbols on the membrane. Rheen was also one of the sources to professor K.B. Wiklund's assumption that Swedish reindeer herding Sami had used Norwegian islands during summer.
