= Ipmil =

God in the Northern Sami language

Ipmil means God in the Northern Sámi language.

Ipmil has been used by Sámi Christians for God, the creator and ruler of the universe. According to the Christian doctrine of Trinity, Ipmil consists of Áhčči (Father), Bárdni (Son, Jesus Christ) and Bassi Vuoigŋa (the Holy Spirit).

Ipmil can also be used as the Northern Sámi translation of God from other religions, such as Allah (Islam) and Adonai (Judaism). Svenska kyrkan (Church of Sweden) has a prayer in Northern Sámi with Ipmil.

The Northern Sámi response to greetings such as buorre beaivi (good day) and buorre eahket (good evening) is Ipmil atte, which can be literally translated to God grant.

== Traditional Sámi religion ==
In traditional Sámi religion, nature and people are one, as opposed to the Christian belief of humans being the stewards of nature. The Father of people is Beaivi (The Sun) and the Mother of people is Eana (The Earth). This is referenced in the works of the most well-known Sámi poet Áillohaš (Nils-Aslak Valkeapää), named Beaivi, áhčážan (The Sun, My Father) and Eanan, eallima eadni (The Earth, Mother of Life).

The world has three layers: the realm of the gods (Ipmiliid áibmu), the realm of the living (Eallevaččaid áibmu), and the realm of the dead (Jábmiid áibmu).

Ipmiliid áibmu is overseen by the highest god, the god of thunder, known by the names Horagállis, Áddjá and Dearpmes. Eallevaččaid áibmu, is overseen by Beaivi. Jábmiid áibmu, is overseen by the Mother of Life, Máttáráhkká (from máttar meaning root and áhkká meaning wife). Máttáráhkká has three daughters: Uksáhkká, Juoksáhkká and Sáráhkká.

Uksáhkká (from uksi meaning door) is the goddess of the home: she guards the entrance of the goahti and the nests of animals. Sáráhkká (unknown name origin) is the goddess of childbirth, and Juoksáhkká (from juoksa meaning a bow) the goddess of hunting. Sáráhkká guards women and Juksáhkká men throughout their lives.

Other gods include birgejumi ipmilat (gods of livelihoods) like Biegga-almmái (man of wind), Čáhcealmmái (man of water), Leaibealmmái (man of bread; god of small prey) and Mánnu (The Moon).

== See also ==
- Ipmil - Wiktionary
- Ipmil atte - Wiktionary
- Lars Levi Laestadius
- Sami shamanism
