= Creator deity =

Entity that created the universe

A creator deity is a deity responsible for the creation of humanity, the Earth and the universe. In creation myths, (Note: The term myth is used here in its academic sense, meaning "a traditional story consisting of events that are ostensibly historical, though often supernatural, explaining the origins of a cultural practice or natural phenomenon". It is not being used to mean "something that is false".) the world often comes into being organically, e.g. sprouting from a primal seed, sexually, by miraculous birth (sometimes by parthenogenesis), by hieros gamos, violently, by the slaying of a primeval monster, or artificially, by a divine demiurge or "craftsman". Sometimes, a god is involved, wittingly or unwittingly, in bringing about creation. In monotheism, the single deity is often also the creator; similarly, a number of monolatristic traditions separate a secondary creator from a primary transcendent being, identified as a primary creator.

== Diversity of creator deities ==
Monolatristic traditions would separate a secondary creator from the primary transcendent being, identified as a primary creator. According to Gaudiya Vaishnavas, Brahma is the secondary creator and not the supreme. Vishnu is the primary creator. According to Vaishnava belief Vishnu creates the basic universal shell and provides all the raw materials and also places the living entities within the material world, fulfilling their own independent will. Brahma works with the materials provided by Vishnu to actually create what are believed to be planets in Puranic terminology, and he supervises the population of them.

Monism is the philosophy that asserts oneness as its fundamental premise, and it contradicts the dualism-based theistic premise that there is a creator God that is eternal and separate from the rest of existence. There are two types of monism, namely spiritual monism which holds that all spiritual reality is one, and material monism which holds that everything including all material reality is one and the same thing.

== By religion ==
=== Atenism ===
Initiated by Pharaoh Akhenaten and Queen Nefertiti around 1330 BCE, during the New Kingdom period in ancient Egyptian history. They built an entirely new capital city (Akhetaten) for themselves and worshippers of their sole creator god in a wilderness. His father used to worship Aten alongside other gods of their polytheistic religion. Aten, for a long time before his father's time, was revered as a god among the many gods and goddesses in Egypt. Atenism was countermanded by later pharaoh Tutankhamun, as chronicled in the artifact, the Restoration Stela. Despite different views, Atenism is considered by some scholars to be one of the frontiers of monotheism in human history.

=== Abrahamic religions ===
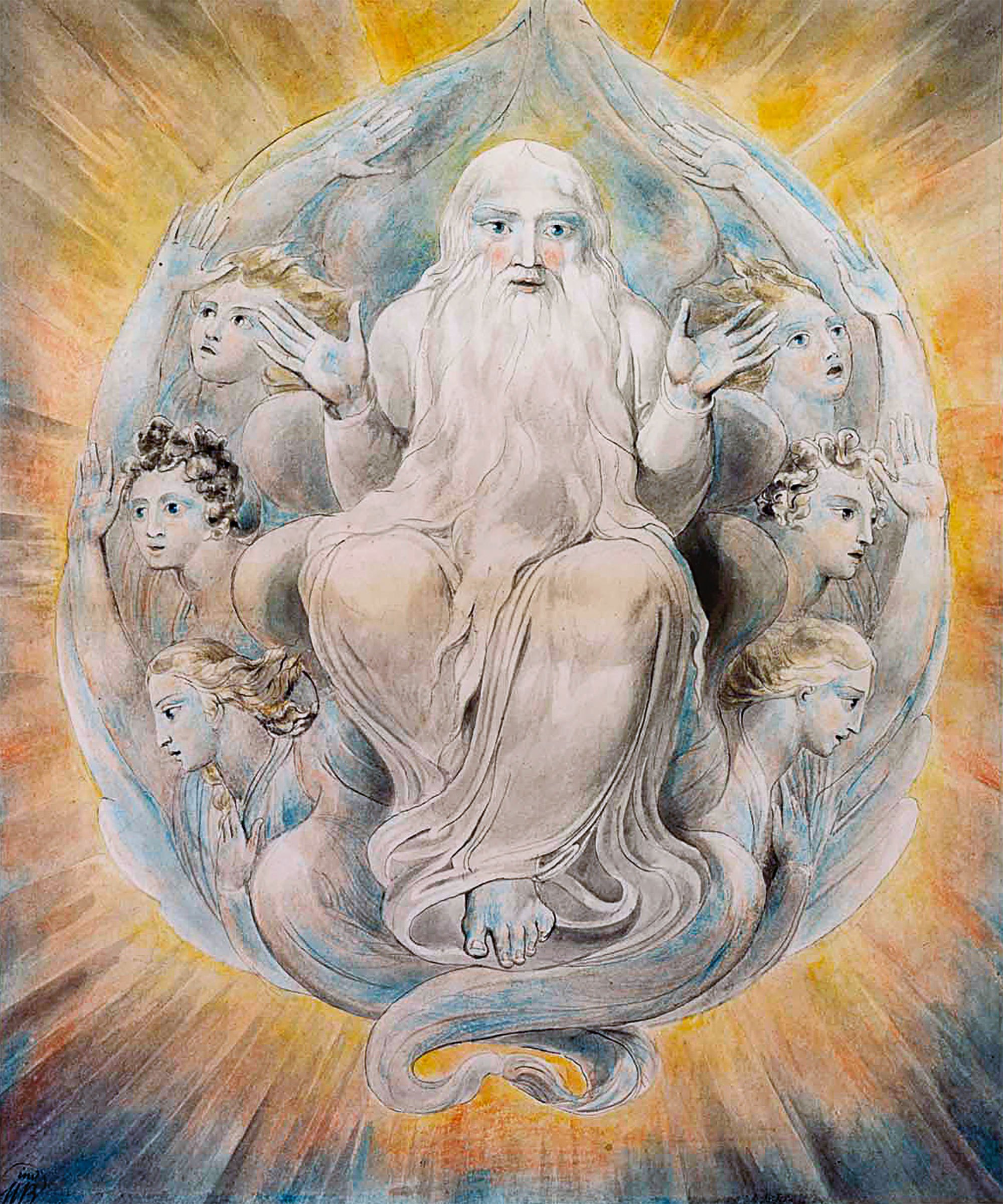
God Blessing the Seventh Day, 1805 watercolor painting by William Blake

The Genesis creation narrative that originated from Judaism is a creation myth shared with Christianity and commonly found in the rest of Abrahamic religions. The narrative is made up of two stories, roughly equivalent to the first two chapters of the Book of Genesis. In the first, Elohim (the Hebrew generic word for God) creates the heavens and the Earth, the animals, and mankind in six days, then rests on, blesses and sanctifies the seventh (i.e. the Biblical Sabbath). The first account (1:1 through 2:3) employs a repetitious structure of divine fiat and fulfillment, then the statement "And there was evening and there was morning, the [nth] day", for each of the six days of creation. In each of the first three days there is an act of division: day one divides the darkness from light, day two the "waters above" from the "waters below", and day three the sea from the land. In each of the next three days these divisions are populated: day four populates the darkness and light with sun, moon, and stars; day five populates seas and skies with fish and fowl; and finally, land-based creatures and mankind populate the land. Meanwhile, in the second story; God, now referred to by the personal name Yahweh, creates Adam, the first man, from dust and places him in the Garden of Eden, where he is given dominion over the animals. Eve, the first woman, is created from Adam as his companion. It expounds themes parallel to those in Mesopotamian mythology, emphasizing the Israelite people's belief in one God.

The first (the Priestly story) was concerned with the cosmic plan of creation, while the second (the Yahwist story) focuses on man as cultivator of his environment and as a moral agent. The second account, in contrast to the regimented seven-day scheme of Genesis 1, uses a simple flowing narrative style that proceeds from God's forming the first man through the Garden of Eden to the creation of the first woman and the institution of marriage. In contrast to the omnipotent God of Genesis 1 creating a god-like humanity, the God of Genesis 2 can fail as well as succeed. The humanity he creates is not god-like, but is punished for acts which would lead to their becoming god-like (Genesis 3:1–24) and the order and method of creation itself differs. "Together, this combination of parallel character and contrasting profile point to the different origin of materials in Genesis 1:1 and Gen 2:4, however elegantly they have now been combined." The first major comprehensive draft of the Pentateuch (the series of five books which begins with Genesis and ends with Deuteronomy) was composed in the late 7th or the 6th century BCE (the Jahwist source) and was later expanded by other authors (the Priestly source) into a work very similar to Genesis as known today. The two sources can be identified in the creation narrative: Priestly and Jahwistic. The combined narrative is a critique of the Mesopotamian theology of creation: Genesis affirms monotheism and denies polytheism. Robert Alter described the combined narrative as "compelling in its archetypal character, its adaptation of myth to monotheistic ends".

An early conflation of Greek philosophy with the narratives in the Hebrew Bible came from Philo of Alexandria (d. 50 CE), writing in the context of Hellenistic Judaism, where Philo equated the Hebrew creator-deity Yahweh with Aristotle's unmoved mover (First Cause). A similar theoretical proposition was demonstrated by Thomas Aquinas, who linked Aristotelian philosophy with the Christian faith, followed by the statement that God is the First Being, the First Mover, and is Pure Act.

==== Christianity ====
The deuterocanonical 2 Maccabees has two relevant passages. At chapter 7, it narrows about the mother of a Jewish proto-martyr telling to her son: "I beseech thee, my son, look upon heaven and earth, and all that is in them: and consider that God made them out of nothing, and mankind also"; at chapter 1, it refers to a solemn prayer hymned by Jonathan, Nehemiah and the Priest of Israel, while making sacrifices in honour of God: "O Lord, Lord God, Creator of all things, who art fearful, and strong, and righteous, and merciful, and the onely, and gracious king".

The Prologue to the Gospel of John begins with: "In the beginning was the Word, and the Word was with God, and the Word was God. ^{2} The same was in the beginning with God. ^{3} All things were made by him, and without him was not any thing made that was made." Christianity affirms the creation by God since its early time in the Apostles' Creed ("I believe in God, the Father almighty, creator of heaven and earth", 1st century CE), that is symmetrical to the Nicene Creed (4th century CE). Nowadays, theologians debate whether the Bible itself teaches if this creation by God is a creation ex nihilo. Traditional interpreters argue on grammatical and syntactical grounds that this is the meaning of Genesis 1:1, which is commonly rendered: "In the beginning God created the heavens and the earth." However, other interpreters understand creation ex nihilo as a 2nd-century theological development. According to this view, church fathers opposed notions appearing in pre-Christian creation myths and in Gnosticism—notions of creation by a demiurge out of a primordial state of matter (known in religious studies as chaos after the Greek term used by Hesiod in his Theogony). Jewish thinkers took up the idea, which became important to Judaism.

==== Islam ====
According to Islam, the creator deity, God, known as Allah, is the all-powerful and all-knowing Creator, Sustainer, Ordainer, and Judge of the universe. Creation is seen as an act of divine choice and mercy, one with a grand purpose: "And We did not create the heaven and earth and that between them in play." Rather, the purpose of humanity is to be tested: "Who has created death and life, that He may test you which of you is best in deed. And He is the All-Mighty, the Oft-Forgiving"; those who pass the test are rewarded with Paradise: "Verily for the Righteous there will be a fulfilment of (the heart's) desires".

According to the Islamic teachings, God exists above the heavens and the creation itself. The Quran mentions, "He it is Who created for you all that is on earth. Then He Istawa (rose over) towards the heaven and made them seven heavens and He is the All-Knower of everything." At the same time, God is unlike anything in creation: "There is nothing like unto Him, and He is the Hearing, the Seeing." and nobody can perceive God in totality: "Vision perceives Him not, but He perceives [all] vision; and He is the Subtle, the Acquainted." God in Islam is not only majestic and sovereign, but also a personal God: "And indeed We have created man, and We know what his ownself whispers to him. And We are nearer to him than his jugular vein (by Our Knowledge)." Allah commands the believers to constantly remember Him ("O you who have believed, remember Allah with much remembrance") and to invoke Him alone ("And whoever invokes besides Allah another deity for which he has no proof—then his account is only with his Lord. Indeed, the disbelievers will not succeed.").

Islam teaches that God as referenced in the Qur'an is the only god and the same God worshipped by members of other Abrahamic religions such as Christianity and Judaism.

==== Baháʼí Faith ====
In the Baháʼí Faith God is the imperishable, uncreated being who is the source of all existence. He is described as "a personal God, unknowable, inaccessible, the source of all Revelation, eternal, omniscient, omnipresent and almighty". Although transcendent and inaccessible directly, his image is reflected in his creation. The purpose of creation is for the created to have the capacity to know and love its creator.

==== Mandaeism ====
In Mandaeism, Hayyi Rabbi (lit. 'The Great Life'), or 'The Great Living God', is the supreme God from which all things emanate. He is also known as "The First Life", since during the creation of the material world, Yushamin emanated from Hayyi Rabbi as the "Second Life". "The principles of the Mandaean doctrine: the belief of the only one great God, Hayyi Rabbi, to whom all absolute properties belong; He created all the worlds, formed the soul through his power, and placed it by means of angels into the human body. So He created Adam and Eve, the first man and woman." Mandaeans recognize God to be the eternal, creator of all, the one and only in domination who has no partner.

=== Sikhism ===
One of the biggest responsibilities in the faith of Sikhism is to worship God as "The Creator", termed Waheguru, who is shapeless, timeless, and sightless, i.e., Nirankar, Akal, and Alakh Niranjan. The religion only takes after the belief in "One God for All" or Ik Onkar.

=== Neoplatonism and Gnosticism ===
Plato, in his dialogue Timaeus, describes a creation myth involving a being called the demiurge (δημιουργός "craftsman"). Neoplatonism and Gnosticism continued and developed this concept. In Neoplatonism, the demiurge represents the second cause or dyad, after the monad. In Gnostic dualism, the demiurge is an imperfect spirit and possibly an evil being, transcended by divine Fullness (Pleroma). Unlike the Abrahamic God, Plato's demiurge is unable to create ex-nihilo.

=== Hinduism ===
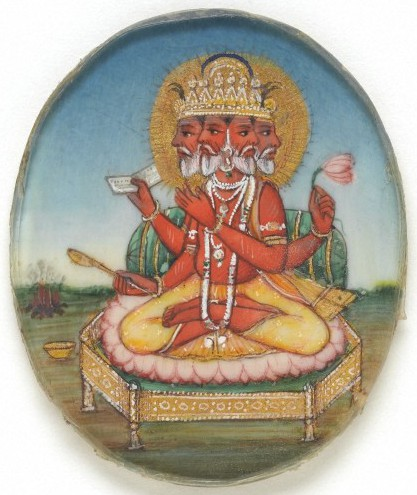
Brahma is often associated with Creation in Hinduism; however, has been demoted to a secondary creator in post-Vedic period.

Hinduism is a diverse system of thought with beliefs spanning monotheism, polytheism, panentheism, pantheism, pandeism, monism, and atheism among others; and its concept of creator deity is complex and depends upon each individual and the tradition and philosophy followed. Hinduism is sometimes referred to as henotheistic (i.e., involving devotion to a single god while accepting the existence of others), but any such term is an overgeneralization.

The Nasadiya Sukta (Creation Hymn) of the Rigveda is one of the earliest texts which "demonstrates a sense of metaphysical speculation" about what created the universe, the concept of god(s) and The One, and whether even The One knows how the universe came into being. The Rig Veda praises various deities, none superior nor inferior, in a henotheistic manner. The hymns repeatedly refer to One Truth and Reality. The "One Truth" of Vedic literature, in modern era scholarship, has been interpreted as monotheism, monism, as well as a deified Hidden Principles behind the great happenings and processes of nature.

The post-Vedic texts of Hinduism offer multiple theories of cosmogony, many involving Brahma. These include Sarga (primary creation of universe) and Visarga (secondary creation), ideas related to the Indian thought that there are two levels of reality, one primary that is unchanging (metaphysical) and other secondary that is always changing (empirical), and that all observed reality of the latter is in an endless repeating cycle of existence, that cosmos and life we experience is continually created, evolved, dissolved and then re-created. The primary creator is extensively discussed in Vedic cosmogonies with Brahman or Purusha or Devi among the terms used for the primary creator, while the Vedic and post-Vedic texts name different gods and goddesses as secondary creators (often Brahma in post-Vedic texts), and in some cases a different god or goddess is the secondary creator at the start of each cosmic cycle (kalpa, aeon).

Brahma is a "secondary creator" as described in the Mahabharata and Puranas, and among the most studied and described. Born from a lotus emerging from the navel of Vishnu, Brahma creates all the forms in the universe, but not the primordial universe itself. In contrast, the Shiva-focused Puranas describe Brahma and Vishnu to have been created by Ardhanarishvara, that is half Shiva and half Parvati; or alternatively, Brahma was born from Rudra, or Vishnu, Shiva and Brahma creating each other cyclically in different aeons (kalpa). Thus in most Puranic texts, Brahma's creative activity depends on the presence and power of a higher god.

In other versions of creation, the creator deity is the one who is equivalent to the Brahman, the metaphysical reality in Hinduism. In Vaishnavism, Vishnu creates Brahma and orders him to order the rest of universe. In Shaivism, Shiva may be treated as the creator. In Shaktism, the Great Goddess creates the Trimurti.

=== Kongo religion ===
The Bakongo people traditionally believe in Nzambi Mpungu, the Creator God, whom the Portuguese compared to the Christian God during colonization. They also believe his female counterpart called Nzambici, the ancestors (bakulu) as well as guardian spirits, such as Lemba, the basimbi, bakisi and bakita. Oral tradition accounts that in the beginning, there was only a circular void (mbûngi) with no life. Nzambi Mpungu summoned a spark of fire (Kalûnga) that grew until it filled the mbûngi. When it grew too large, Kalûnga became a great force of energy and unleashed heated elements across space, forming the universe with the sun, stars, planets, etc. Because of this, Kalûnga is seen as the origin of life and a force of motion. The Bakongo believe that life requires constant change and perpetual motion. Nzambi Mpunga is also referred to as Kalûnga, the God of change. Similarities between the Bakongo belief of Kalûnga and the Big Bang Theory have been studied.

Nzambi is also said to have created two worlds. As Kalûnga filled mbûngi, it created an invisible line that divided the circle in half. The top half represents the physical world (Ku Nseke or nsi a bamôyo), while the bottom half represents the spiritual world of the ancestors (Ku Mpèmba). The Kalûnga line separates these two worlds, and all living things exists on one side or another. After creation, the line and the mbûngi circle became a river, carrying people between the worlds at birth and death. Then the process repeats and a person is reborn. A simbi (pl. bisimbi) is a water spirit that is believed to inhabit bodies of water and rocks, having the ability to guide bakulu, or the ancestors, along the Kalûnga line to the spiritual world after death. They are also present during the baptisms of African American Christians, according to Hoodoo tradition.

=== Chinese traditional cosmology ===
Pangu can be interpreted as another creator deity. In the beginning there was nothing in the universe except a formless chaos. However this chaos began to coalesce into a cosmic egg for eighteen thousand years. Within it, the perfectly opposed principles of yin and yang became balanced and Pangu emerged (or woke up) from the egg. Pangu is usually depicted as a primitive, hairy giant with horns on his head and clad in furs. Pangu set about the task of creating the world: he separated Yin from Yang with a swing of his giant axe, creating the Earth (murky Yin) and the Sky (clear Yang). To keep them separated, Pangu stood between them and pushed up the Sky. This task took eighteen thousand years, with each day the sky grew ten feet higher, the Earth ten feet wider, and Pangu ten feet taller. In some versions of the story, Pangu is aided in this task by the four most prominent beasts, namely the Turtle, the Qilin, the Phoenix, and the Dragon.

After eighteen thousand years had elapsed, Pangu was laid to rest. His breath became the wind; his voice the thunder; left eye the sun and right eye the moon; his body became the mountains and extremes of the world; his blood formed rivers; his muscles the fertile lands; his facial hair the stars and milky way; his fur the bushes and forests; his bones the valuable minerals; his bone marrows sacred diamonds; his sweat fell as rain; and the fleas on his fur carried by the wind became human beings all over the world.

The first writer to record the myth of Pangu was Xu Zheng during the Three Kingdoms period.

Shangdi is another creator deity, possibly prior to Pangu; sharing concepts similar to Abrahamic faiths.

=== Kazakh ===
According to Kazakh folk tales, Jasagnan is the creator of the world.

=== Other ===
- Sub-Saharan African contexts:
  - Mbombo of Bakuba mythology, who vomited out the world upon feeling a stomachache
  - Unkulunkulu in Christian Zulu mythology
- American contexts:
  - Chiminigagua (and/or Bague) in Muisca mythology
  - Viracocha in Inca mythology
- Near Eastern contexts:
  - Egyptian mythology
    - Atum in Ennead, whose semen becomes the primal component of the universe
    - Ptah creating the universe by the Word
    - Neith, who wove all of the universe and existence into being on her loom.
  - ’Ēl in Canaanite religion
  - Marduk killing Tiamat in the Babylonian Enûma Eliš
- Asian contexts:
  - Atingkok Maru Sidaba in Manipuri mythology, the creator of the universe
  - Izanagi and Izanami-no-Mikoto in Japanese mythology, who churned the ocean with a spear, creating the islands of Japan
  - Pangu in Chinese mythology, he is the one who separated heaven and earth and became geographic features such as mountains and rivers
  - Thần Trụ Trời the god who created the world in Vietnamese mythology
- European contexts:
  - The sons of Borr slaying the primeval giant Ymir in Norse mythology
  - Ipmil or Radien-Áhči (Radien Father) in Sámi mythology
- Oceanic contexts:
  - Makemake, creator of humanity, the god of fertility and the chief god of the "Tangata manu" or "bird-man" cult of Rapa Nui mythology.
  - Ranginui, the Sky Father, and Papatūānuku, the Earth Mother in Māori mythology

== Religions without a creator deity ==
=== Buddhism ===
Buddhism denies a creator deity and posits that mundane deities such as Mahabrahma are misperceived to be a creator.

=== Jainism ===
Jainism does not support belief in a creator deity. According to Jain doctrine, the universe and its constituents—soul, matter, space, time, and principles of motion have always existed (a static universe similar to that of Epicureanism and steady state cosmological model). All the constituents and actions are governed by universal natural laws. It is not possible to create matter out of nothing and hence the sum total of matter in the universe remains the same (similar to law of conservation of mass). Similarly, the soul of each living being is unique and uncreated and has existed since beginningless time.^{[a]}

The Jain theory of causation holds that a cause and its effect are always identical in nature and therefore a conscious and immaterial entity like God cannot create a material entity like the universe. Furthermore, according to the Jain concept of divinity, any soul who destroys its karmas and desires achieves liberation. A soul who destroys all its passions and desires has no desire to interfere in the working of the universe. Moral rewards and sufferings are not the work of a divine being, but a result of an innate moral order in the cosmos; a self-regulating mechanism whereby the individual reaps the fruits of his own actions through the workings of the karmas.

Through the ages, Jain philosophers have adamantly rejected and opposed the concept of creator and omnipotent God and this has resulted in Jainism being labeled as nāstika darsana or atheist philosophy by the rival religious philosophies. The theme of non-creationism and absence of omnipotent God and divine grace runs strongly in all the philosophical dimensions of Jainism, including its cosmology, karma, moksa and its moral code of conduct. Jainism asserts a religious and virtuous life is possible without the idea of a creator god.

== See also ==
- Creation myth – Symbolic narrative of how the world began
  - Dreamtime – Sacred era in Australian Aboriginal mythology
- Deism – Belief in a God who does not intervene in the universe
- Existence – State of being real
- Why is there anything at all – Metaphysical question
