= Máttaráhkká =

Mother goddess in Sámi shamanism

Máttaráhkká as depicted on a Sámi drum.

Máttaráhkká (also Maderakka, Madderakka and Maadteraahka; lit. 'origin woman') is a mother goddess in Sámi shamanism. She lives in the ground under the goahti. She is connected to childbirth and has been said to give child its body and make female humans and animals fertile. It's been recorded drinks were offered to her so she'd be merciful towards a pregnant woman.

In Western Sápmi, she was thought to have three daughters: Sáráhkká, Juoksáhkká and Uksáhkká. In Eastern Sápmi, such as in the area of modern-day Finland, these daughters were not known. This has led some researchers to conclude the daughters were born out of later Scandinavian influence.

According to Christfried Ganander in 1789, Máttaráhkká received a child from Radien-attje and gave it life, handing it over to Sáráhkká who then put it in the woman's womb. Her, as well as her daughters, are primarily known as helpers of women. After the arrival of Christianity, she came to be associated with Virgin Mary.

On some Sámi drums, she is given the husband Máttaráhttje, but he has a much smaller role and has thus been assumed to be a later addition.

The Sámi of Kola Peninsula had the word mändir-ähke ("parent's grandmother"), due to which Kaarle Krohn thought that Máttaráhkká (as well as the Finnish Manteren akka) was originally a female ancestor buried in the ground and worshipped by later generations, primarily women.
