= Sør-Rana Municipality =

Former municipality in Nordland, Norway

Sør-Rana Municipality Sør-Rana herred
- Former municipality
- Nordland within Norway

- Sør-Rana within Nordland
- Coordinates: 66°13′29″N 13°36′59″E
- Country: Norway
- County: Nordland
- District: Helgeland
- Established: 1 July 1929
  - Preceded by: Hemnes Municipality
- Disestablished: 1 Jan 1964
  - Succeeded by: Rana Municipality and Hemnes Municipality

Government
  - Mayor (1962-1964): Kåre Rønning (Sp)

Area (upon dissolution)
  - Total: 777 km^{2} (300 sq mi)
  - Rank: #118 in Norway
- Highest elevation: 1,915.75 m (6,285.3 ft)

Population (1963)
  - Total: 1,608
  - Rank: #519 in Norway
  - Density: 2.1/km^{2} (5.4/sq mi)
  - Change (10 years): ▼ −13.1%
- Demonym: Ranværing

Official language
  - Norwegian form: Neutral
- Time zone: UTC+01:00 (CET)
  - Summer (DST): UTC+02:00 (CEST)
- ISO 3166 code: NO-1831

Sør-Rana is a former municipality in Nordland county, Norway. The 777-square-kilometre (300 sq mi) municipality existed from 1929 until its dissolution in 1964. The areais now part of Hemnes Municipality. (Hemnes Municipality was also named Sør-Rana from 1838 until 1844). Sør-Rana encompassed an area on both sides of the middle section of the Ranfjorden around where the Sørfjorden and Elsfjorden branch off the main fjord.

Prior to its dissolution in 1964, the 777-square-kilometre (300 sq mi) municipality was the 118th largest by area out of the 689 municipalities in Norway. Sør-Rana Municipality was the 519th most populous municipality in Norway with a population of about 1,608. The municipality's population density was 2.1 inhabitants per square kilometre (5.4/sq mi) and its population had decreased by 13.1% over the previous 10-year period.

== General information ==
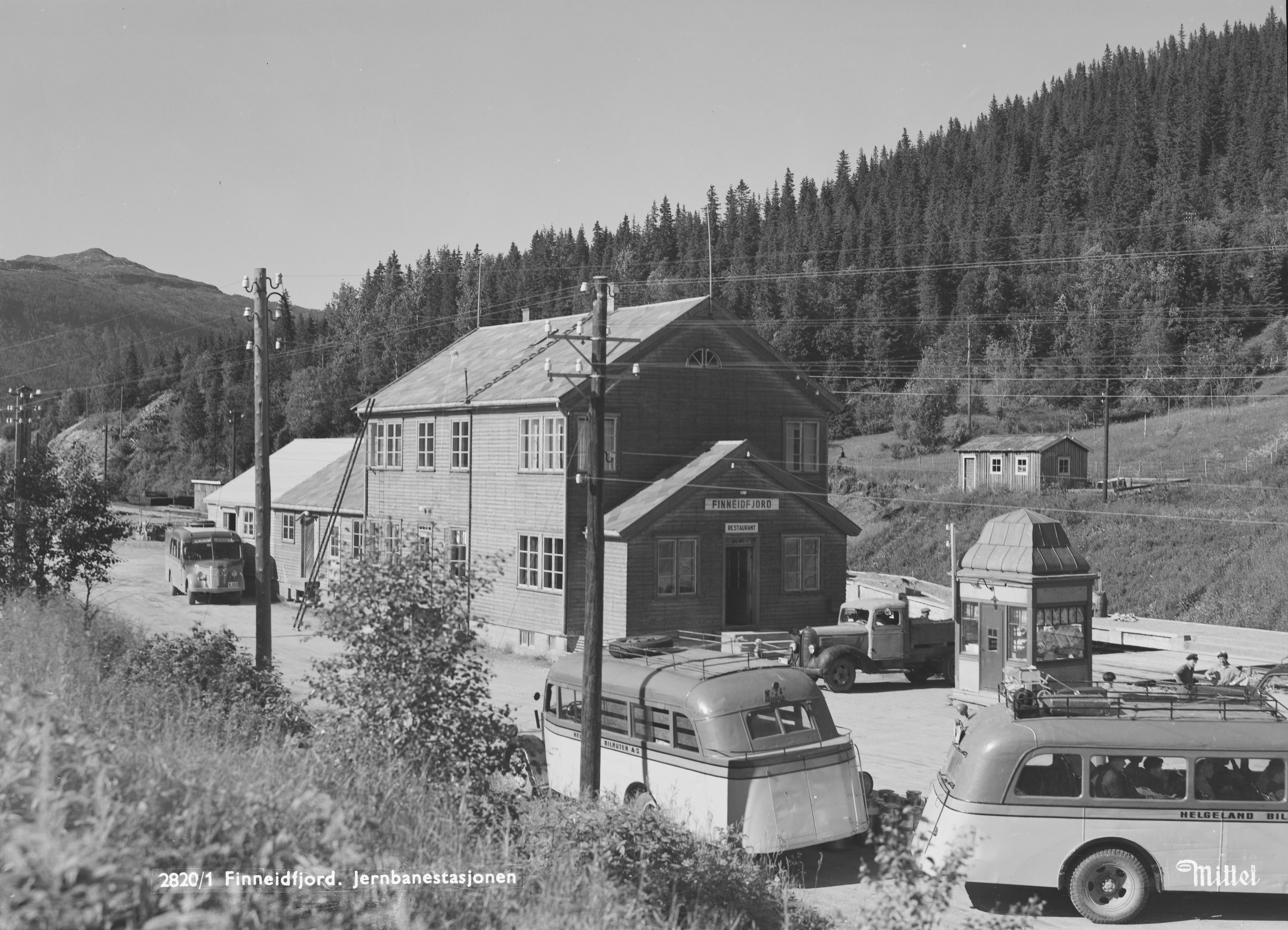
View of the Finneidfjord Station in Sør-Rana (c. 1950s)

Rana Municipality was established on 1 January 1838 under the old formannskapsdistrikt law. Shortly afterwards, in 1839, the municipality was divided into Nord-Ranen Municipality and Sør-Ranen Municipality. In 1844, Sør-Ranen Municipality was renamed Hemnes Municipality. On 1 July 1918, the southern part of Hemnes Municipality (population: 1,369) was separated to become the new Korgen Municipality. On 1 July 1929 the large Hemnes Municipality was divided into three separate municipalities: Elsfjord Municipality (population: 765) in the southwest, Hemnes Municipality (population: 1,077) which included the small area around the village of Hemnesberget, and Sør-Rana Municipality (population: 1,708) in the north and east.

During the 1960s, there were many municipal mergers across Norway due to the work of the Schei Committee. On 1 January 1964, Sør-Rana Municipality was dissolved and its lands were divided up. The district of Sør-Rana that was north of the Ranfjorden, with 697 inhabitants, was merged with the town of Mo i Rana (population: 9,6168), all of Nord-Rana Municipality (population: 11,636), and the eastern part of Nesna Municipality (population: 543) to create the new Rana Municipality. The rest of Sør-Rana Municipality (south of the Ranfjorden), with 934 inhabitants, was merged with Hemnes Municipality (population: 1,352), all of Korgen Municipality (population: 3,033), and the northern part of Hattfjelldal Municipality (population: 168) to form a new, larger Hemnes Municipality.

=== Name ===
The municipality was named Sør-Rana. The first element is sør which directly translates to "southern". The second element is Rana which comes from the local river Ranelva (Old Norse: Raðund). The name of the river is probably derived from the word raðr which means "quick", "fast", or "rapid". Another possibility is that the name comes from the old Sami god Rana Niejta.

=== Churches ===
The Church of Norway had one parish (sokn) in Sør-Rana Municipality. At the time of the municipal dissolution, it was part of the Hemnes prestegjeld and the Indre Helgeland prosti (deanery) in the Diocese of Sør-Hålogaland. There was only one church, Hemnes Church, for the prestegjeld and it was located in Hemnes Municipality, an enclave municipality within the larger, rural Sør-Rana Municipality.

== Geography ==
The highest point in the municipality was the 1,915.75-metre (6,285.3 ft) tall mountain Oksskolten. Sør-Rana encompassed an area on both sides of the middle section of the Ranfjorden around where the Sørfjorden and Elsfjorden branch off the main fjord. Nord-Rana Municipality was located to the northeast; Nesna Municipality was located to the west; Elsfjord Municipality, Korgen Municipality, and Hattfjelldal Municipality were all located to the south; and the nation of Sweden was to the east. Hemnes Municipality was an enclave located within the borders of Sør-Rana Municipality.

== Government ==
While it existed, Sør-Rana Municipality was responsible for primary education (through 10th grade), outpatient health services, senior citizen services, welfare and other social services, zoning, economic development, and municipal roads and utilities. The municipality was governed by a municipal council of directly elected representatives. The mayor was indirectly elected by a vote of the municipal council. The municipality was under the jurisdiction of the Hålogaland Court of Appeal.

=== Municipal council ===
The municipal council (Herredsstyre) of Sør-Rana Municipality was made up of 15 representatives that were elected to four year terms. The tables below show the historical composition of the council by political party.

Sør-Rana herredsstyre 1959–1963
Party name (in Norwegian)	Number of representatives
Labour Party (Arbeiderpartiet)	7
List of workers, fishermen, and small farmholders (Arbeidere, fiskere, småbrukere liste)	2
Joint List(s) of Non-Socialist Parties (Borgerlige Felleslister)	6
Total number of members:	15
Note: On 1 January 1964, Sør-Rana Municipality was dissolved and its lands became part of Rana Municipality and Hemnes Municipality.

Sør-Rana herredsstyre 1955–1959
Party name (in Norwegian)	Number of representatives
Labour Party (Arbeiderpartiet)	8
Joint List(s) of Non-Socialist Parties (Borgerlige Felleslister)	7
Total number of members:	15

Sør-Rana herredsstyre 1951–1955
Party name (in Norwegian)	Number of representatives
Labour Party (Arbeiderpartiet)	7
Joint List(s) of Non-Socialist Parties (Borgerlige Felleslister)	5
Total number of members:	12

Sør-Rana herredsstyre 1947–1951
Party name (in Norwegian)	Number of representatives
Labour Party (Arbeiderpartiet)	7
Farmers' Party (Bondepartiet)	5
Total number of members:	12

Sør-Rana herredsstyre 1945–1947
Party name (in Norwegian)	Number of representatives
Labour Party (Arbeiderpartiet)	7
Joint List(s) of Non-Socialist Parties (Borgerlige Felleslister)	4
Local List(s) (Lokale lister)	1
Total number of members:	12

Sør-Rana herredsstyre 1937–1941*
Party name (in Norwegian)	Number of representatives
Labour Party (Arbeiderpartiet)	5
Joint List(s) of Non-Socialist Parties (Borgerlige Felleslister)	5
Local List(s) (Lokale lister)	2
Total number of members:	12
Note: Due to the German occupation of Norway during World War II, no elections were held for new municipal councils until after the war ended in 1945.

=== Mayors ===
The mayor (Norwegian: ordfører) of Sør-Rana Municipality was the political leader of the municipality and the chairperson of the municipal council. Here is a list of people who held this position:

- 1929–1934: Johan L. Fineide
- 1935–1937: O. Bjørnåli
- 1937–1938: Ole Evensen
- 1938–1940: Hans J. Utskarpen
- 1945–1945: O. Bjørnåli
- 1945–1945: Hans J. Utskarpen
- 1946–1955: Ole Evensen
- 1956–1961: Kristoffer Almli
- 1962–1964: Kåre Rønning (Sp)

== See also ==
- List of former municipalities of Norway
