= Juoksáhkká =

Juoksáhkká is depicted on Sámi drums with a bow.

Juoksáhkká (also Juksakka, Joeksaahka lit. 'bow woman'; Stäukedne lit. 'bow mother') is a goddess in Sámi shamanism related to childbirth. She is one of the daughters of Máttaráhkká along with Sáráhkká and Uksáhkká and lived in the ground under the goahti, at the back according to some sources. She was only known to Sámi in Scandinavian parts of Sápmi but not, for example, in the area of modern day Finland.

Juoksáhkká helped with the development and birth of a child, and if she was brought offerings enough, she could change the child's sex from female to male in the womb. As sons were more wanted than daughters, she was given plentiful offerings. According to Christfried Ganander in 1789, she also helped women during menstruation and protected children from shots and falls. Ganander gave many of Juoksáhkká's features to Uksáhkká and vice versa and claimed that she was always at odds with Lieaibolmmai.

After a woman had given birth, she ate the porridge of Sáráhkká. In the case of a son, a small bow and arrow were put in the porridge in three pieces total, and if the mother hit any of the pieces with her spoon while eating, the future of the child was attempted to be predicted from this. The little bow and arrow was put next to the cradle of the son so he'd grow to be a skilled archer, and he was supposed to keep the items in the future as well.

In Salten, Jiukom-akka ("carer woman") refers to either Juoksáhkká or Uksáhkká. Some researchers have considered the two the same being, but this is not the case according to Uno Holmberg. He thought Juoksáhkká was born out of foreign influence since Sámi women were not even permitted to touch a hunting bow, a man's tool, but Juoksáhkká is a goddess depicted holding a bow.
