= Áhčešeátni =

Áhčešeátni or Áhčešeátne (also Hatsjædne, Ter Sami: Aadz, Skolt Sami: Accy, Aahtsek, Ahttsek, Kildin Sami: Aacce, Inari Sami: Haccišan) is the daughter of the Moon and originator of various illnesses and unpleasant animals in Sámi shamanism. She is also the mother of the trickster figure Askovis.

== Myths ==
Áhčešeátni is best known from an epic joik released by Anders Fjellner. In it, the heroes Njáveš and Háhčeš each marry the daughter of the Sun and the Moon: Njávešeátni and Áhčešeátni. As both were pregnant, their husbands got murdered. Njávešeátni tamed wild reindeer and gave them to humans, while Áhčešeátni was mean to her own reindeer, causing them to become wild. Njávešeátni gave birth to a son and Áhčešeátni to a daughter, but once when picking berries they decided to compete: whomever filled their bucket with berries first won the son for herself. Áhčešeátni won by cheating and took the boy.

After this, Áhčešeátni became worse and was impregnated by north wind, giving birth to a son named Atsits. He is thought to be the same as South Sámi son of Áhčešeátni, Askovis. Much later, Njávešeatni's son happened to run into his mother's goahti and found out the truth of who his real mother is. He killed the treacherous Áhčešeatni, and her reindeer turned into frogs, toads, and harmful animals. Alternatively, her reindeer became wild and said harmful animals came from Áhčešeatni's corpse.

Atsits was pulled up by the Moon when he insulted her as being paler than father Sun. The Sámi of Inari and Sør-Varanger have called the person on the Moon "Attčsej" or "the daughter of Hatsjædne". Skolts have described the lunar eclipse as "the daughter of Ahttsehk eating the Moon". It has also been said that the daughter's cropse turned into a frog.

Eastern versions of the myth could present the two women as mortals and leave Njávešeátni nameless, but Áhčešeátni's connection to the Moon and harmful animals still exists in eastern folklore. In some Kildin Sámi versions, she turns into moss that is then used in the cradles of children. Both western and eastern Sámi groups have said that skeletal muscle cramps were caused by Áhčešeátni. Skolts healed cramps by cutting off a branch of a birch and chanting: mahtsattam Ahttsek 'I return Ahttsek'.

== Comparisons ==
Áhčešeátni has been connected to the dualistic "evil god" figure common in Uralic mythologies. She has also been compared to Finnish Syöjätär, who is described as the originator of snakes, lizards and toads, and Louhi who also got pregnant from north wind.
