= Coat of arms of Kautokeino =

The coat of arms of Kautokeino/Guovdageainnu was designed by Arvid Sveen and awarded to the municipality by royal resolution on 4 September 1987. It is a gold lavvu on a blue field. The lávvu is a traditional temporary dwelling similar to the tipi and symbolises the municipality's traditions from the Sami people, gold symbolises the sami culture's richness and diversity and the blue field symbolises the arctic climate and nature.

== Blazon ==
The official blazon is written in Norwegian. It is here also translated to English, in the traditional way blazons are written.

- Norwegian: I blått en gull lavvo
- English: Azure a lavvu Or

== See also ==
- Sami institutional symbols
- Kautokeino Municipality#Coat of arms

== Sources ==
- Kautokeino municipality web page on the coat of arms (Norwegian)
- Norwegian national archives on the arms
