= Kuokkel mining field =

Open pit mine in Kiruna, Norrbotten, Sweden

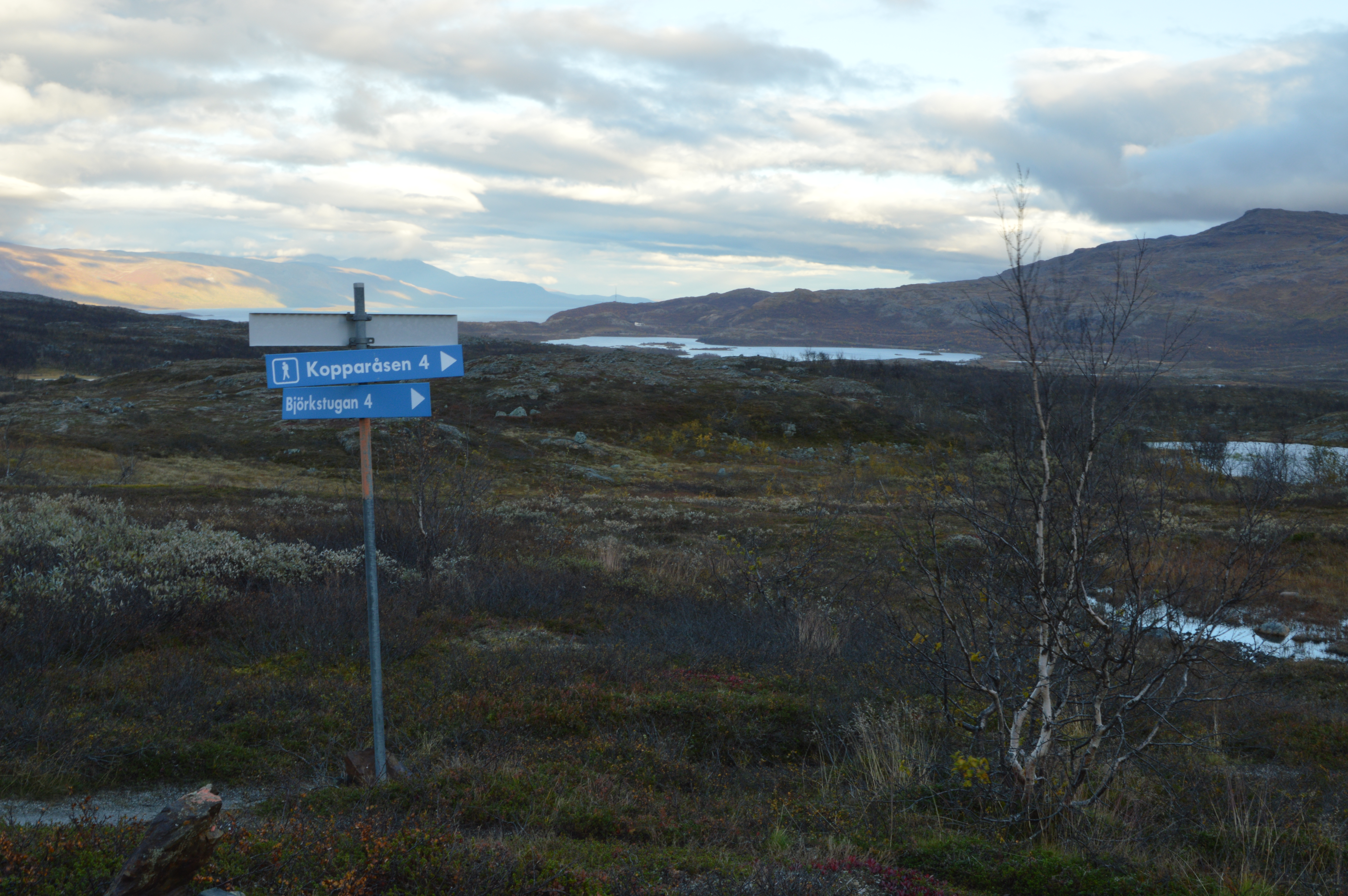
View of Koukkel coppermine

Kuokkel mining field (Swedish: Kuokelgruvan) is an abandoned open pit mine in the vicinity of Kopparåsen railway station on the Iron Ore Line in Kiruna municipality, Norrbotten County, Sweden. The mine field was once used to mine Chalcocite (Cu_{2}S), Bornite (Cu_{5}FeS_{4}), and Sphalerite ((Zn, Fe)S).

== History ==
On the information plate found on the path to the mine field, the following information is given:

Kopparåsen copper mine (Koukola ore field) was incorporated in 1897 by civil engineer Alwin Jacobi. The mining operation at Koukola took place between 1899 and 1906 and the plans were first very grand. The idea was that some processing of the ore would also take place at the site, which meant that a workforce of about 500 people could be employed later on. However, these plans did not come true. At the beginning of the operation, there was considerable transport difficulties, but in 1902 the Riksgränsen railway was completed and connected to the Swedish-Norwegian border, and the same year also formed the Koukola Malmfält Company. The path for a cable car from the mine to the railway, but it turned out that the copper was too limited to make it a profitable company and the planned cable car never came to be built. The work at the mine was very small and was interrupted in 1904 after a severe explosion accident and after further mining efforts, the mine was completely abandoned in 1906, and not any further claims on the mining right have been made. Alwin Jacobi, who invested 800,000-900,000 dollars in mapping, investigations, travel and mining, died in 1905 and left only debt. Today you can see a number of fractures with sharpenings and mining holes scattered across the plateau. One can marvel at the blown stones stacked carefully in piles at each mining site. the explanation is that the work was carried out on chords and paid with SEK 4.50 per cubic meter. The proper organization was designed to simplify the volume calculation. There are also the remains of a trench railway on which small carts with stone and ore circulated from the open pit to a spalling place, where the ore was separated from the waste rock. The mining company's office and residential building have been preserved and are now privately owned, but there are also leftovers for other buildings, including a so-called peat Goahti. It was a simple building covered with peat and it was probably used as a worker's residence before proper building materials were transported here in 1900. Just north of the peat Goahti there are remains of a forge, the accompanying remains of gear and tools.

The above-mentioned accident hit the brothers named "Jansson" in one of the mines which seems to have led to their death.

== Gallery ==
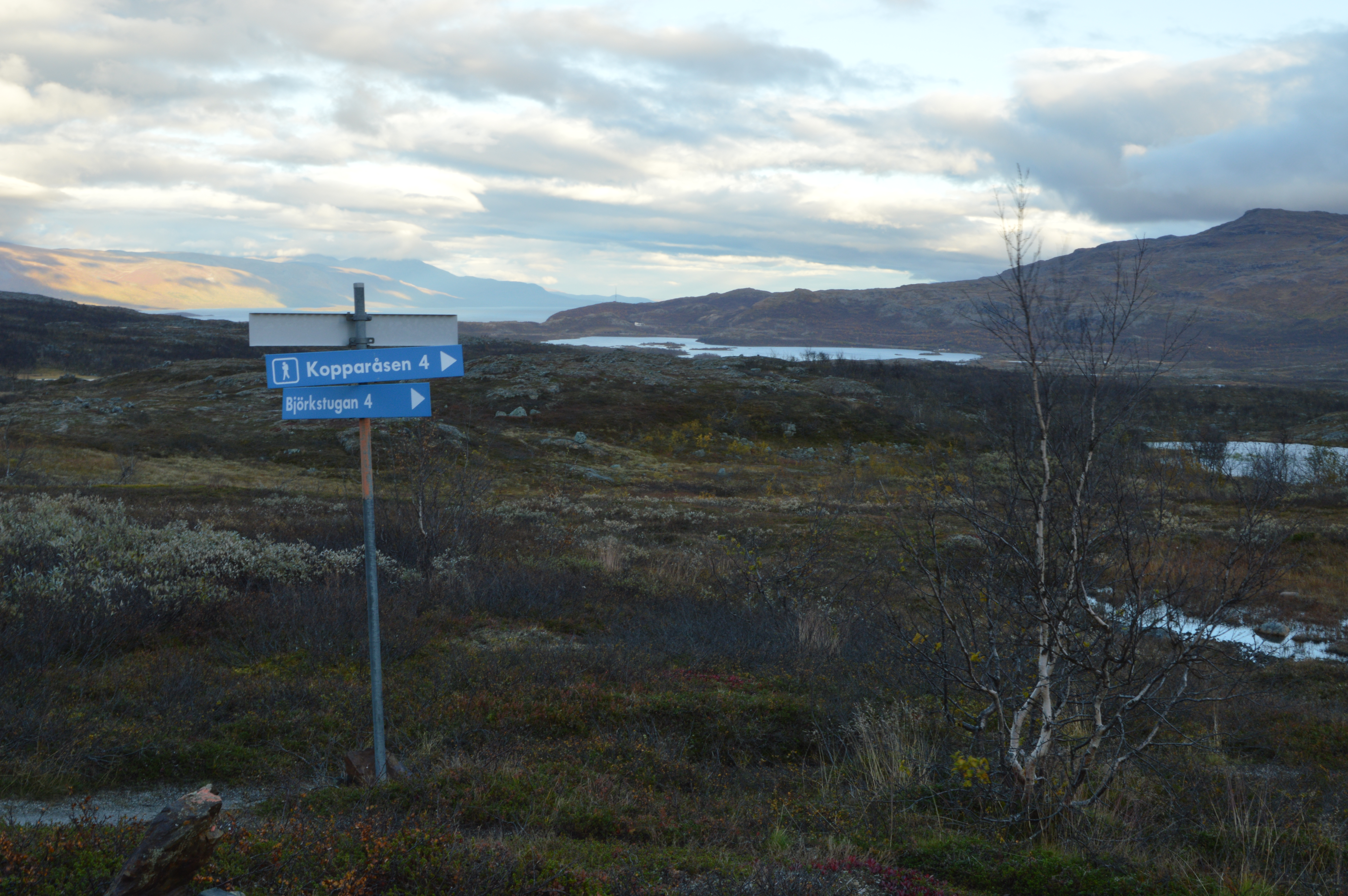
View over the site

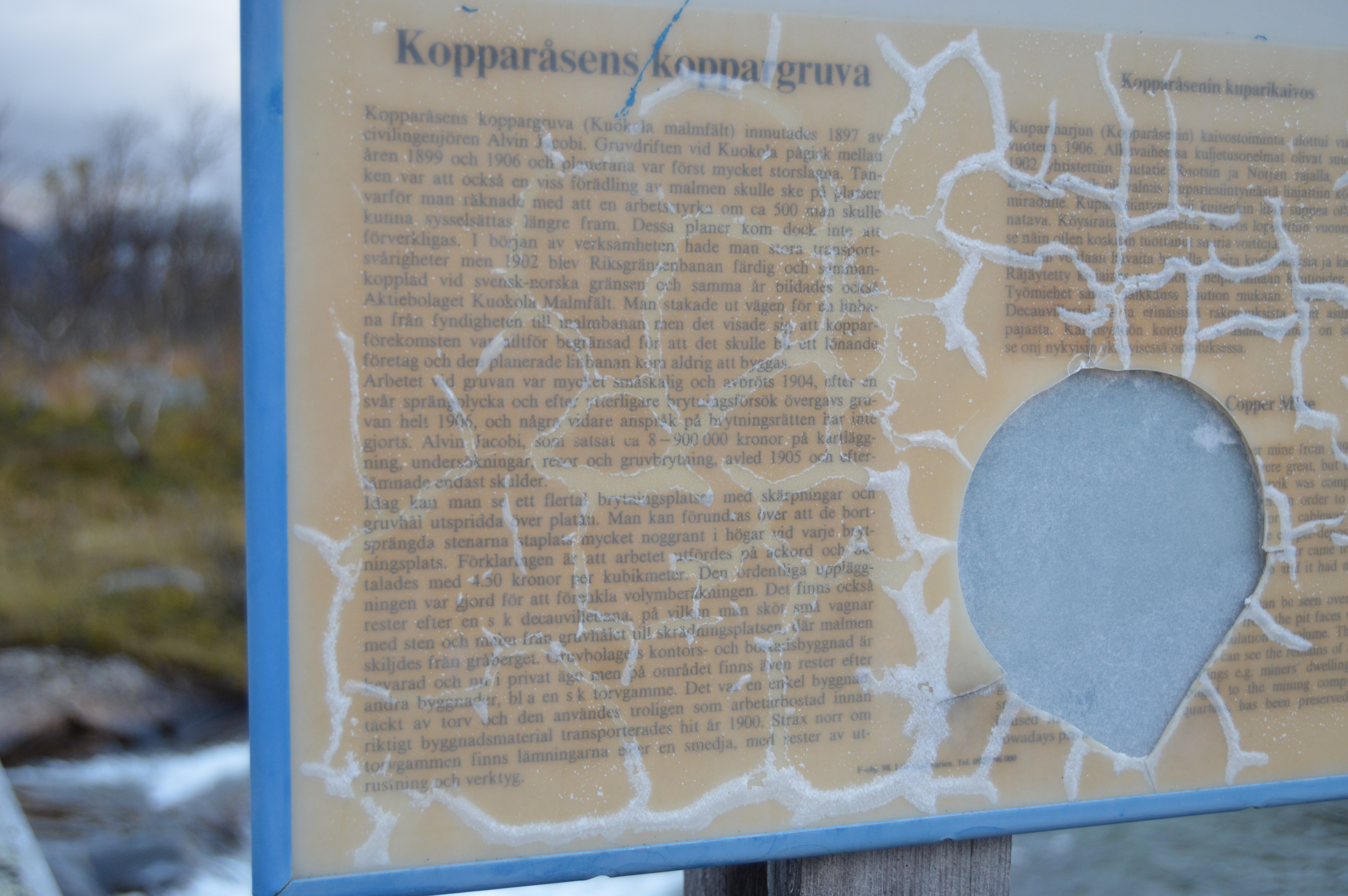
Information panel

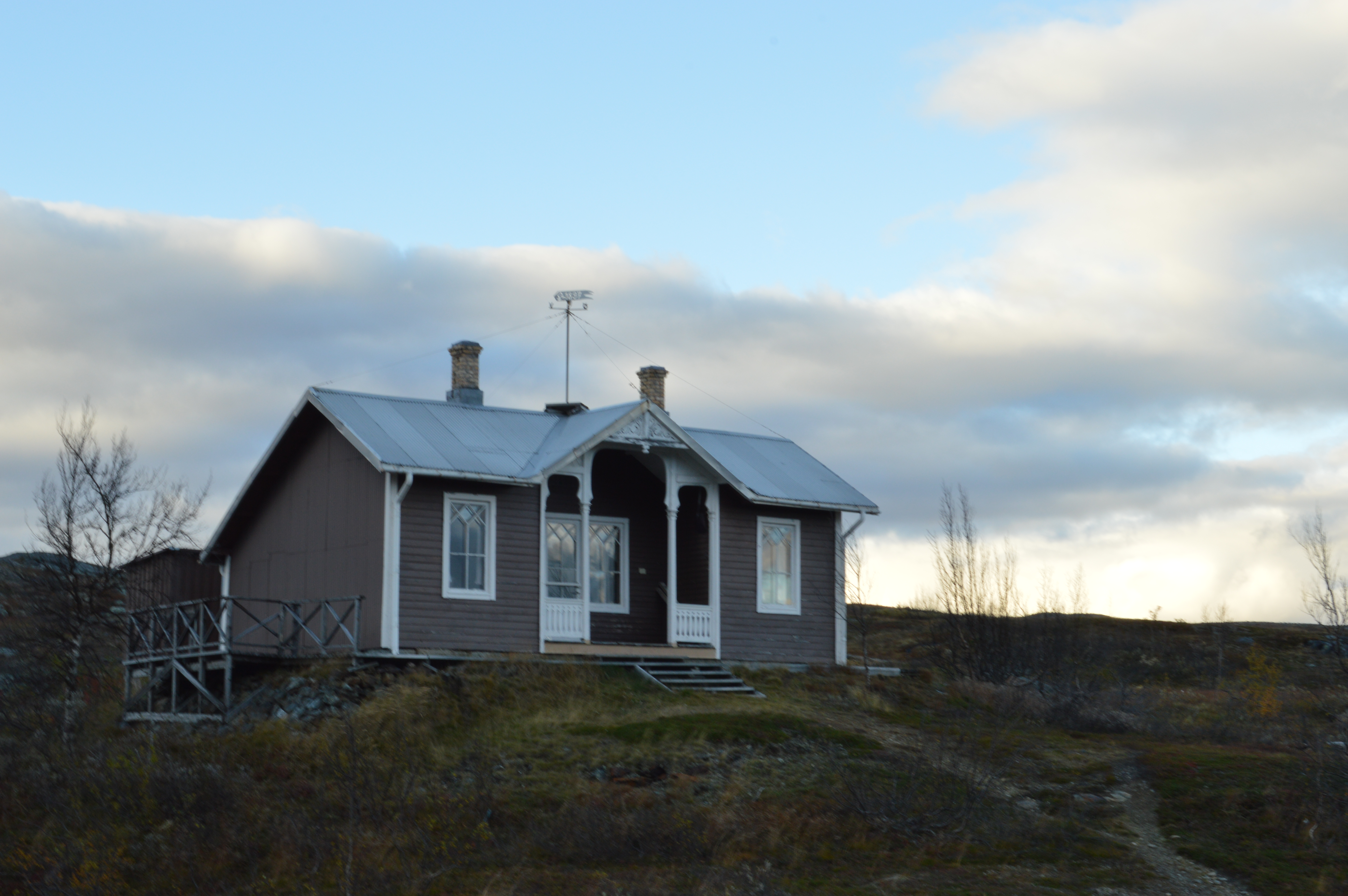
Office and residence of Alwin Jacobi
