= Mano (mythology) =

Personification of the moon in Sami mythology

Mánnu
- The Moon
- Other names: Mano, Manna, Manno, Aske
- Venerated in: Sámi shamanism
- Gender: Female
- Offspring: Áhčešeátni

In Sami shamanism, Mánnu (also spelled Mano, Manno and Manna) or Aske is a personification of the Moon as a female deity.

At least one noaidi drum with a Mano Moon symbol has been discovered.

== Myths ==
The Moon is connected to Stállu: sometimes the Stállu is a son of the Moon, sometimes it turns into the Moon, and sometimes it steals the Moon.

In a myth written down by Gustaf von Düben, the first humans were two men named Njáveš and Háhčeš. Njáveš married Njávešeátni, the daughter of the Sun, while Háhčeš married Áhčešeátni, the daughter of the Moon. As both were pregnant, their husbands got murdered. Njávešeátni tamed wild reindeer and gave them to humans, while Áhčešeátni was mean to her own reindeer, causing them to become wild. Njávešeátni gave birth to a son and Áhčešeátni to a daughter, but once when picking berries they decided to compete: whomever filled their bucket with berries first won the son for herself. Áhčešeátni won by cheating and took the boy.

After this, Áhčešeátni became worse and was impregnated by north wind, giving birth to a son named Atsits. He was also evil and treated reindeer poorly, but got his punishment when he insulted mother Moon as being less bright than father Sun. The Moon pulled Atsits up to her, where he can still be seen. Atsits is thought to be the same as South Sámi son of Áhčešeátni, Askovis. The Sámi of Inari and Sør-Varanger have called the person on the Moon "Attčsej" or "the daughter of Hatsjædne". Skolts have described the lunar eclipse as "the daughter of Ahttsehk eating the Moon".

== Rituals ==
Like other nature-deities, the goddess Mánnu is seen as unpredictable and dangerous. She is worshiped around the time of the new moon, especially around the winter solstice, and during that time it is taboo to make any kind of noise, for the Moon of December is dangerous and quick to anger. During new moon, a copper ring was set to the hole in the top of the goahti so the moon would shine through it, ensuring safety for reindeer doe giving birth. In November, a ring and a year-old reindeer was sacrificed to the Moon.

Near Gällivare, there was a custom to tie hays to reindeer antlers and offer them to the Moon while making as much noise as possible to attract the Moon's attention in February. According to another source, Sámi of Norway sacrificed female and white animals to Mánnu, just like was done to Beaivi.

The new moon is connected to growth and is the best time to slaughter reindeer, cut trees, and give birth.

== See also ==
- List of lunar deities
