= Sáráhkká =

Sáráhkká is depicted on Sámi drums with a forked stick.

Sáráhkká (also Sarakka, Saaraahka, Sadsla-akka and Saredne) is a goddess in Sámi shamanism connected to childbirth. She is one of the daughters of Máttaráhkká along with Juoksáhkká and Uksáhkká. After Radien-attje hands a fetus to Máttaráhkká who gives it life, she hands it over to Sáráhkká who puts it in the woman's womb and gives the fetus a body. She lived in ground under the goahti with her mother and sisters. She was only known to Sámi in modern day Norway and Sweden, not in Finland or Russia.

She is the most important and worshipped out of the Sámi goddesses of childbirth. She protected and eased with the birthing pains of not only humans but reindeer as well. She also felt the same pains as a woman giving birth, and she was very important for Sámi women. Before labour, the woman drank "Sáráhkká's booze" and after, she ate "Sáráhkká's porridge".

She was also worshipped during menstruation, when women had to take off their collars and belts for Sáráhkká. A menstruating woman was not allowed to step over a man's foot or gun nor go too close to the coastline where fishermen threw their fish from the boats, nor milk cows. After period, a woman baked a pastry only the women were allowed to eat.

Her name has been connected to the word sárrit ("to split"). Wood was split into two for Sáráhkká in order to make childbirth easier. These pieces of wood were considered so scared one was not permitted to even touch them. Spring water was also poured on the ground for Sáráhkká. Animals were also sacrificed: when a woman felt she was going to be a mother, she got a dog and kept it until it was time for labour. Then she'd bury the dog alive so the gods would help her. After a successful birth, a reindeer or other domesticated animal was sacrificed. Only female animals were sacrificed with the exception of roosters. Some pregnant women offered Sáráhkká alcohol, meat and cheese, usually in the fireplace; she lived below the hearth.

Christianity had an effect on the cult of Sáráhkká. There were baptisms (laugo) where a child was given the name of an ancestor and devoted to Sáráhkká. Before or after going to church, people held events were they consumed the "flesh and blood of Sáráhkká", and this was also held for other gods so they wouldn't be angry with the Sámi when they were forced to go for the Eucharist by priests. Later, Virgin Mary replaced Sáráhkká. The Sáráhkká cult developed so she was worshipped not only by women but men as well.

The modern Sámi women's organisation The Sarahkka formed in 1988 is named in honor of her.
