= Raedieahkka =

Sami goddess

Raedieahkka or Radien-akka is a goddess in the Sami mythology. She is the wife of the Sami high god Radien-attje, and the mother of Rana Niejta and Raediengiedte.

She and her husband are described as the two divinities who created the world and the human soul together.
