= Sámi institutional symbols =

Sámi institutional symbols are of relatively new origin, as the Sámi political institutions themselves are quite new. The symbols generally draw inspiration from old ornamental traditions such as duodji and the "runes" of the traditional shaman's drums. The symbols generally don't follow the rules of tincture, as the "Sámi colours" are traditionally placed colour on colour (rather than colour on metal and vice versa).

== Sámi flag ==
Sami flag

Though the highest ranking symbol, the flag does not symbolize any particular institution. It is, however, as of 1986 the official flag of all Sámi in all countries and a recognized flag in Norway. Hence, it is used by most important Sámi institutions. The flag is a combination of an old, unofficial flag and an often-used sun/moon symbol of the shaman's drum. It is inspired by a mythological poem claiming the Sámi to be "children of the Sun".

With the creation of this flag, the "national colours" of the Sámi were defined as red, green, yellow and blue. All of these are heraldic colours, except yellow which is a metal ("ore") in heraldic terms.

== Pan-Sámi political structures ==
=== Sámi Council ===
The Sámi Council, which organizes Sámi non-governmental organisations at the international level has a symbol that predates the Sámi flag. In appearance it is similar to the arppa – a chain of rings used together with shaman's drums to predict the future. It symbolizes unity between Sámi of the four states.

== Sámi parliaments ==
=== Sámi Parliament of Norway ===
The logo of the Sámi Parliament of Norway draws the least inspiration from the Sámi flag. It represents the parliament building seen from above, with the main corpus marked in grey and the hall of parliament in red. However, the building is designed to suggest the sun/moon symbol when seen from above.

=== Sámi Parliament of Sweden ===
The logo of the Sámi Parliament of Sweden features a circle in the four Sámi colours. The circle is striped in resemblance of a shaman's drum's sun-symbol. Within the circle there is a runic symbol resembling an arrow pointing southwest.

=== Sámi Parliament of Finland ===
The logo of the Sámi Parliament of Finland features a red circle with a yellow line at the bottom (inside the circle) and four blue lines radiating from it - symbolizing the sun. The four lines represent the four Sámi groups of Finland, and the three colours are that of the first Sámi flag. The green colour was originally added to represent the South Sámi, who are not native to Finland.

== Russian Sámi organisation ==
There is no longer a Sámi Parliament of Russia. The elected Council of Plenipotentiary Representatives of the Sámi of Murmansk Province uses a symbol heavily inspired by the flag: two reindeer horns joined like a crescent, the upper half red and the lower half blue, between the halves are two stripes in yellow and green. The official Centre for Indigenous People in Murmansk Province, under which the official Council of Indigenous Peoples under the [Provincial] Government operates, uses a logo also inspired by the flag: a circle, left half blue and right half red, at the centre of which is a brown lávvu, a blue line symbolizing water, and a multicoloured line symbolizing the Aurora Borealis, the colours of the latter being from left to right red, yellow, green and blue.

== Other Sámi institutions ==
=== Finnmark Estate ===
Finnmárkuopmodat, the autonomous entity established by the Finnmark Act has a logo that according to the entity's website "gets it colours from the Sámi and the Norwegian flag, as a symbol that the Finnmark Estate feels related to and responsible for both Sámi, kvens and ethnic Norwegians. (...) The circular shape... refers both to the Sámi flag's sun-symbol and to the solid and safe envelopment of a circle. (...) It is opened up to allow the Northern Lights a gateway into the Norwegian and the Sámi flag's colours."
