= Tjaetsieålmaj =

God in the Sami mythology

Tjaetsieålmaj (other spellings Thjathjeolmai, Inari Sami: Čäcialmai, lit. 'water man') controlled lakes and rivers, and gave fishing fortune to people in Sami mythology. The word Thjathje means water, and is said to be the origin of the name of the Norse jötunn Tjatsi.
