= Radien-pardne =

Sami god

Radien-pardne on a Sámi drum.

Radien-pardne (also Radien-bardne, Southern Sami: Raedienbaernie) or Raediengiedte (also Radienkiedde) is a Sami god, the son of Radien-attje and Raedieahkka in Sami mythology.

He is an active god with the task to perform the orders of his passive father. With his parents, he forms a trinity which has been compared to God the Father, Jesus, and Virgin Mary.

While the name Čorve-radien 'horn ruler' has sometimes been equated with Radien-attje, there are times when it and Kierfva-Radien seem to refer to Radien-pardne.
