= Uksáhkká =

Uksáhkká as depicted on a Sámi drum.

Uksáhkká (also Uksakka, Oksaahka lit. 'door woman') is a goddess in Sámi shamanism related to childbirth. She is one of the daughters of Máttaráhkká along with Sáráhkká and Juoksáhkká and lived in the ground under the goahti, below the door specifically. She was only known to Sámi in Scandinavian parts of Sápmi but not, for example, in the area of modern day Finland.

Uksáhkká protected people when they stepped in or out of the goahti. In childbirth, her role was to receive the child into the world. She also protected the child later, especially when learning to walk so the child wouldn't hurt themself. She also made sure a child wouldn't get lost from the goahti. She was offered drinks poured to her home, under the goahti's door.

Christfried Ganander gave many of Juoksáhkká's features to Uksáhkká and vice versa, claiming that Uksáhkká could turn daughters into sons in the womb, typically Juoksáhkká's role. Uksáhkká would then also help women during menstruation, a role Ganander gives to Juoksáhkká.

In Salten, Jiukom-akka ("carer woman") refers to either Juoksáhkká or Uksáhkká. Some researchers have considered the two the same being, but this is not the case according to Uno Holmberg. Holmberg compared Uksáhkká to the Swedish door rå, dörrkäring "door's old woman".

Due to Christian influence, Uksáhkká was later equated with Virgin Mary.
