= Kåre Rønning =

Norwegian politician (1929–1990)

Personal details
- Born: 24 September 1929 Sør-Rana Municipality
- Died: 27 December 1990 (aged 61)

Kåre Rønning (24 September 1929 in Sør-Rana Municipality – 27 December 1990) was a Norwegian politician for the Centre Party.

He was elected to the Norwegian Parliament from Nordland in 1973, and was re-elected on one occasion. He had previously served as a deputy representative during the term 1969–1973.

On the local level he was a member of the municipal council of Sør-Rana Municipality from 1959 to 1975, serving as deputy mayor from 1959 to 1961 and mayor from 1962 to 1963. From 1962 to 1963 he, being mayor, was also a member of the Nordland county council. He was a member of the national party board from 1973 to 1978, and chaired the county party chapter from 1964 to 1965 and from 1981.

Outside politics, he was a farmer and was active in the Norwegian Agrarian Association.
