= Ruohtta =

God and personification of sickness and death in Sami mythology

Ruohtta is the god and the personification of sickness and death in Sami mythology. He is the ruler of the land of the dead, Rotaimo. Contrary to Sami practice, he travelled on horseback.

The horse is among the Sami, a feared and detested animal, probably because it was the preferred form of transportation of the Norsemen. People who did not live their lives according to the natural orders came to Rotaimo, deep underground. There they also receive a new body, but they can never leave Rotaimo again.
