= Lavvu =

Sámi temporary dwelling

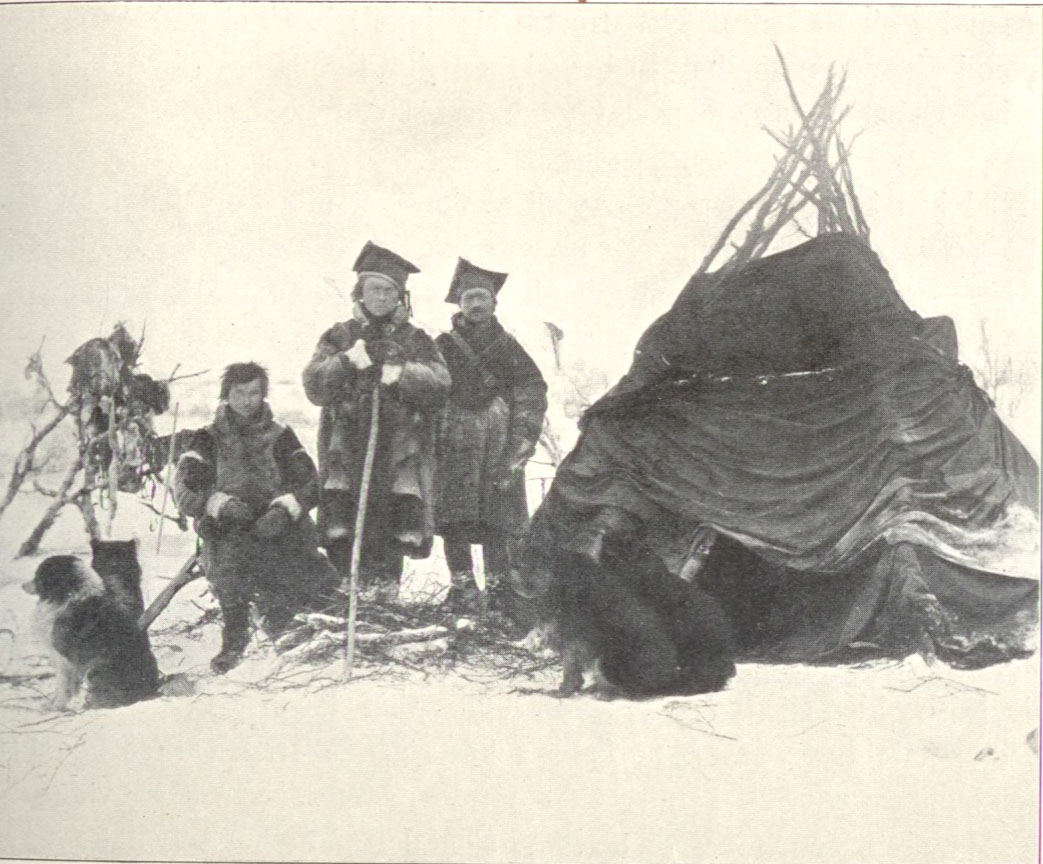
A lavvu in the late 1800s, from "Norge i det nittende aarhundrede" (1900).

A lavvu (or Northern Sami: lávvu, Lule Sami: låvdagoahte, Inari Sami: láávu, Skolt Sami: kååvas, Kildin Sami: коавас (kåvas), Finnish: kota or umpilaavu, Norwegian: lavvo or sametelt, and Swedish: kåta) is a temporary dwelling used by the Sami people of northern extremes of Northern Europe. It has a design similar to a Native American tipi but is less vertical and more stable in high winds. It enables the indigenous cultures of the treeless plains of northern Scandinavia and the high arctic of Eurasia to follow their reindeer herds. It is still used as a temporary shelter by the Sami, and increasingly by other people for camping. It should not be confused with the goahti, another type of Sami dwelling, or the Finnish laavu.

== Historical definition ==
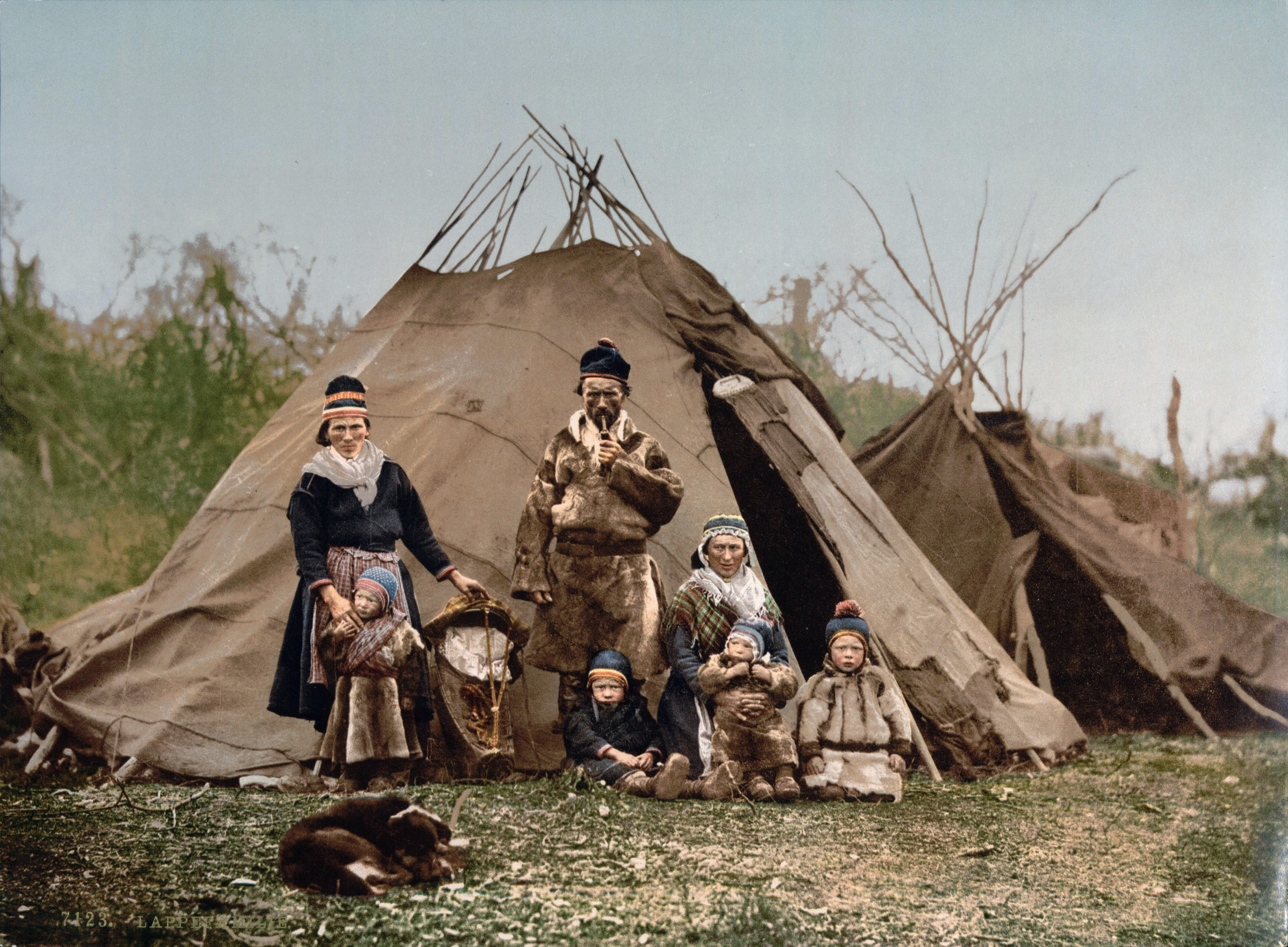
A Sami family in front of a goahti in the foreground and a lavvu in the background (the picture is taken around 1900).

There are several historical references that describe the lavvu structure used by the Sami. These structures have the following in common:

1. The lavvu is supported by three or more evenly spaced forked or notched poles that form a tripod.
2. There are upwards of ten or more unsecured straight poles that are laid up against the tripod and which give form to the structure.
3. The lavvu does not need any stakes, guy-wire or ropes to provide shape or stability to the structure.
4. The shape and volume of the lavvu is determined by the size and quantity of the poles that are used for the structure.
5. There is no center pole needed to support this structure.

No historical record has come to light that describes the Sami using a single-pole structure claimed to be a lavvu, or any other Scandinavian variant name for the structure. The definition and description of this structure has been fairly consistent since the 17th century and possibly many centuries earlier.

The goahti, also used by the Sami, has a different pole configuration. While trees suitable to make lavvu poles are quite easy to find and often left at the site for later use, the four curved poles of the goahti have to be carried.

== Traditional and modern lavvu ==
The traditional lavvu consists of two types of wooden poles: 1) three or more forked poles and; 2) several straight poles. The forked poles have a two-stem fork at the top end. These three poles are interlocked so that they form a tripod. Upon this assembly of the forked poles, the straight poles are laid in a circular fashion. Reindeer hides were used as a cover until the mid-19th century when large amounts of inexpensive manufactured British textiles were made available to the Sami.

The traditional lavvus are still in use, but for ease of transportation modern designs have replaced the wooden poles with aluminum ones and heavier textiles with lighter fabrics. In addition, instead of an open fire an oven can be used. This reduces the smoke but produces less light making it quite dark inside. A lavvu of this type is easier to carry and is a common alternative to the tents often used for camping.

Very large lavvus also exist with enough room for dozens of people. These are typically used for large families.

== Symbolism ==
The coat of arms of Kautokeino Municipality (Guovdageainnu Municipality), Norway.

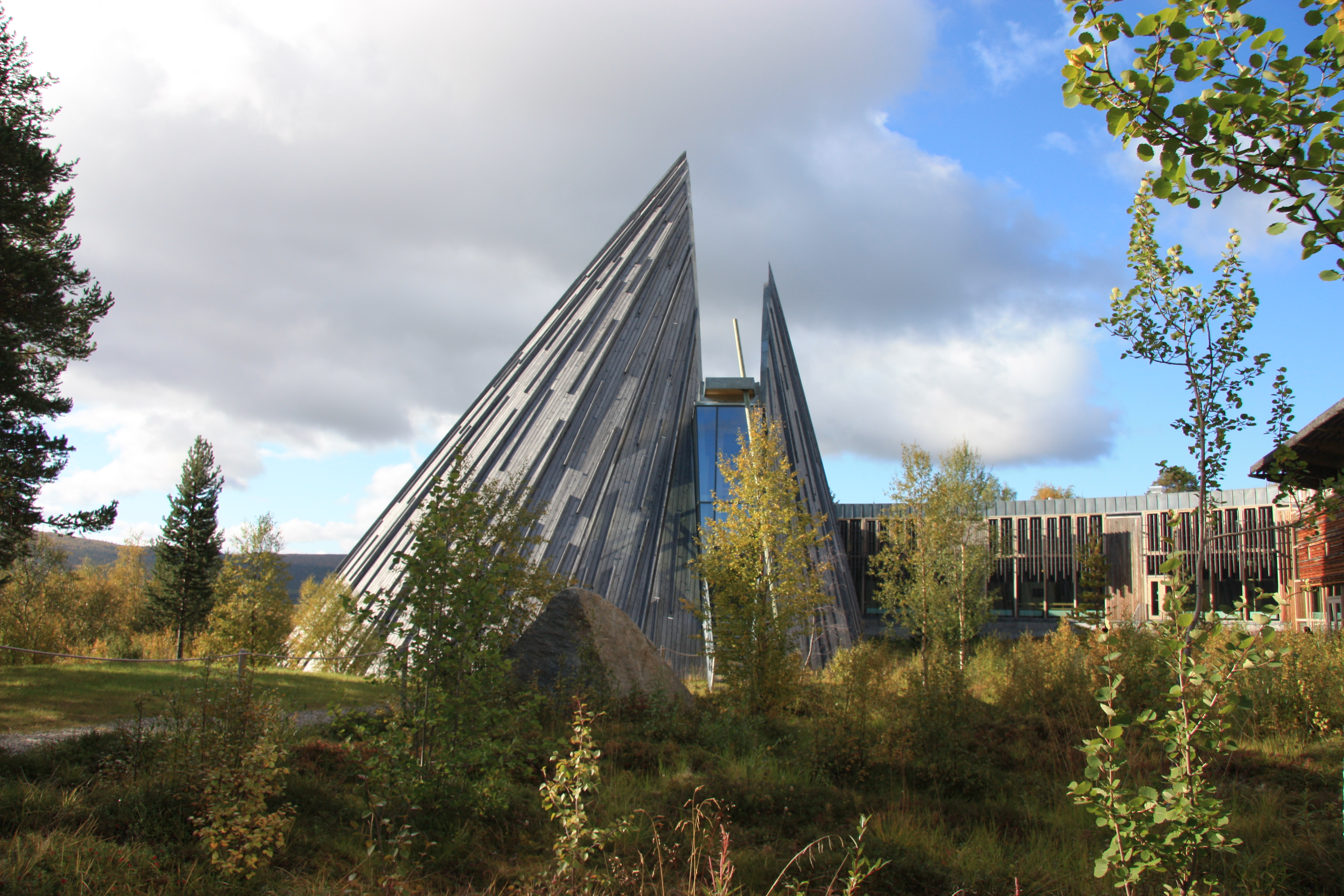
The lavvu inspired shape of the Sámi Parliament building in Kárášjohka (Karasjok), Norway

The lavvu has been – and still is – a strong symbol for the Sami as a cultural haven. The lavvu played a prominent role in two events during the 20th century as more than just a shelter. The first was at the end of World War II during the winter of 1944/45 when the German troops retreated westward across northern Norway, burning most of the housing in Finnmark and eastern Troms counties before the Russian Red Army. Because of this destruction, many Sami lived in lavvus for many years afterward because of the lack of housing and unemployment from this period. Some of these Sami are still alive today who were born in these lavvus and have fond memories of them.

The second event was when the lavvu was used during the Alta controversy in Norway from 1979 to 1981. A lavvu was set up in front of the Storting (Norwegian Parliament Building) which became an international focal point as several Sami went on a hunger strike to protest the proposed dam project that would have destroyed reindeer grazing grounds of the Sami herders in the area and inundated the Sami village of Máze. This lavvu became center stage in the political fight for Sami indigenous rights. The irony was not missed when the Oslo police bulldozed the lavvu during the protest. This conflict gave birth to the Sami Rights Committee which addressed Sami legal rights within Norway, resulting in the Sami Act of 1987. This in turn became the foundation for the Sámediggi (Sami Parliament of Norway), a democratically elected body for the Sami in Norway in 1989, and the Finnmark Act of 2005.

The strong symbolism of the lavvu has also been shown in its pictorial form as the coat-of-arms for Guovdageainnu Municipality (Kautokeino) and in the physical shape of the Sámediggi building, whose shape was inspired by the lavvu.

== Using a lavvu ==
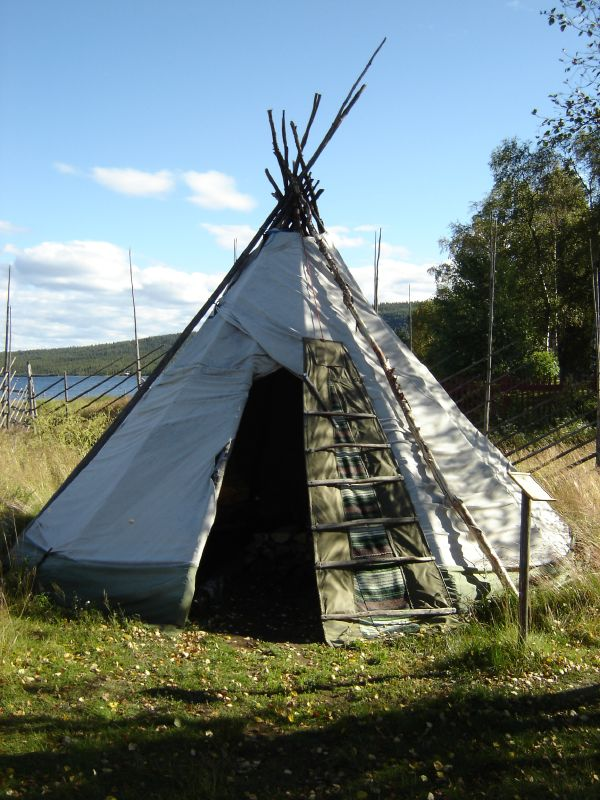
Sami lavvu at the open-air museum in Jukkasjärvi, Sweden.

Inside the living quarters of the lavvu, there is a fireplace in the middle used for heating and to keep mosquitoes away. The smoke escapes through the smoke hole in the top of the lavvu that is usually left open. Occasionally a rough blanket is wrapped around the smoke hole to make the opening smaller, but not to the point where smoke would be prevented from escaping. In order to prevent smoke from building up inside, proper air circulation is maintained by leaving an opening between the ground and the cover, or leaving the door slightly open. Keeping the fire hot enough to let the heated smoke rise through the smoke hole is necessary.

Traditionally, there was a smaller door in the back of the lavvu, opposite the front door, called the bear door. This was used for ceremonial purposes, such as removing the dead (not appropriate out of the front door) and similar functions. Few lavvus today have this door for such purposes.

== Other tent designs similar to lavvu ==
- Tipi - The Native American tipi is visually similar to the lavvu but has a different cut to the fabric and a slightly different pole structure and placement.
- Chum (tent) - The peoples of northern Ural, northern Siberia and the Tyvan Todzhans of southern Siberia have a tent structure that is similar in design and often much larger than the lavvu. It is still in use by these people as a year-round shelter.
- Goahti (Norwegian: gamme, Finnish: kota, Swedish: kåta) - The goahti is often confused with a lavvu, although it has a different pole structure, is more elongated and is typically lower to the ground. In the first photo above, the tent in the background is a lavvu, while the tent in the foreground is a goahti.
- Kohte, a traditional German scouting tent derived from the Lavvu, but is usually black.

== See also ==
- Sami people
