= Lieaibolmmai =

God of the hunt in Sami mythology

Lieaibolmmai, Leibolmai, Liejbbeålmáj, or Leib-Olmai ("alder man") is the god of the hunt in Sami mythology.

He is the ruler of the wild animals in the forests, and the hunters made sacrifices in his honour to obtain good hunting fortune.

As the god of hunting he is the god of good luck. He lives in the trees of Alder and gives good luck to hunters against bears, and he appears to humans in the form of a bear.

In honour of Leib-Olmai, at bears feasts the hunters' faces were sprinkled with a brownish-red mixture of ground-up alder bark and water.
