= Radien-attje =

Sami Deity

- Radien as depicted on Sámi drums
- Other names: Jubmel, Ibmel, Maylmen Olmai, Vearalden Olmai, Waralden Olmai
- Gender: Male

Genealogy
- Consort: Raedieahkka
- Children: Radien-pardne (son); Rana Niejta (daughter, in some versions)

Equivalents
- Finnish: Virankannos

Radien-attje, Jubmel, Maylmen Olmai, Vearalden Olmai or Waralden Olmai is a celestial deity of the Sami. He is also called Jubmel or Ibmel, a parallel to the Finnish Jumala (god).

He is the ruler of the Cosmos. In his honour, the Sami erect a sacrificial pole every autumn, symbolizing the world pillar, which is considered as a connection the World to the firmament. The pillar reached from the centre of the Earth to the fix point on the firmament—the Pole star. He is also the "giver of life" and is considered the god of fertility.

Radien-attje exists only among Southern and Western Sámi. For Eastern Sámi groups, Radien-attje seems to have fused into the thunder god Tiermes, as Tiermes is also seen as the ruler over human life, health, and well-being. There is a theory that Tiermes is the original Sámi sky god, while Radien-attje was born later out of Norse pagan and Christian influences. Despite Radien-attje's common description as the supreme god, Sámi pantheon most likely lacked any hierarchy between deities.

== Name ==
The terms Jubmel and Ibmel are suspected to be loans from Finnish. It mostly refers to the sky god Radien but in one source also refers to the thunder god. Radien comes from radit 'to rule' in present participle singular genitive, the accurate nominative being Raedie. Versions such as Veralden rad and Mailmen radien mean 'the ruler of the world'. Radien-attje means 'ruler father'. The name Raedie comes from the southernmost dialect of South Sámi, other dialects using Raerie. According to Knud Leem, some Sámi considered Radien to be the same as Čorve-radien 'horn ruler'. Jens Kildal considered Mailmen radien and Čorve-radien to be separate entities. The names Čorve-radien and Kierfva-Radien could also in many cases refer to Radien-pardne.

In Norway, the one who hold up the sky was called the fertility god Veralden olmai 'man of the world'. It is a cognate with an epithet for the Germanic god Freyr. Uno Holmberg considered Veralden olmai and Storjunkare to be terms for a fertility god loaned from the Scandinavians.

== Description ==
Radien-attje is often portrayed as the main figure in a Trinity, which besides him, consists of his wife Raedieahkka and their son Radien-pardne. There are critics who claim, that this Trinity is a consequence of the meeting with the Christian religion, and that it is a match to God the Father, Jesus the Son and the Holy Spirit. If this is the case, the Sami have replaced the Holy Spirit with a wife. The influence for the trio are likely God, Jesus, and Virgin Mary. In some versions, the heavenly family also includes the daughter Rana Niejta. As superior deity, Radien-attje is more of an intellectual superior, as his son, Radien-pardne, performs the practical things.

Radien-attje's role is to give a child its spirit and take the souls of the righteous to him in Radien-aimo 'home of the ruler'. According to Holmberg, the worship of Maximen radien clearly had its origins in pre-Christian times. A male reindeer or other animal was sacrificed to him so he wouldn't "let the world collapse". On the sacrificial altar was a forking tree symbolizing the world pillar Veralden tsould which Radien-attje used to hold up the world. As genitals of reindeer were also offered to Radien-attje, it's been thought that he was partially influenced by the cult of Norse fertility god Freyr.

Johan Randulf compared Veralden olmai to Saturn and said the Sámi prayed him for good harvest so they could buy grain and products made of it, for fertile seas in order to get plenty of fish, for fertile reindeer, and for plenty of lichen for the reindeer to eat so they could be milked for butter and cheese.

== Sources ==
- Sphinx-Suche (in German) - retrieved January 16, 2006 .
