= Ancient Sámi religion =

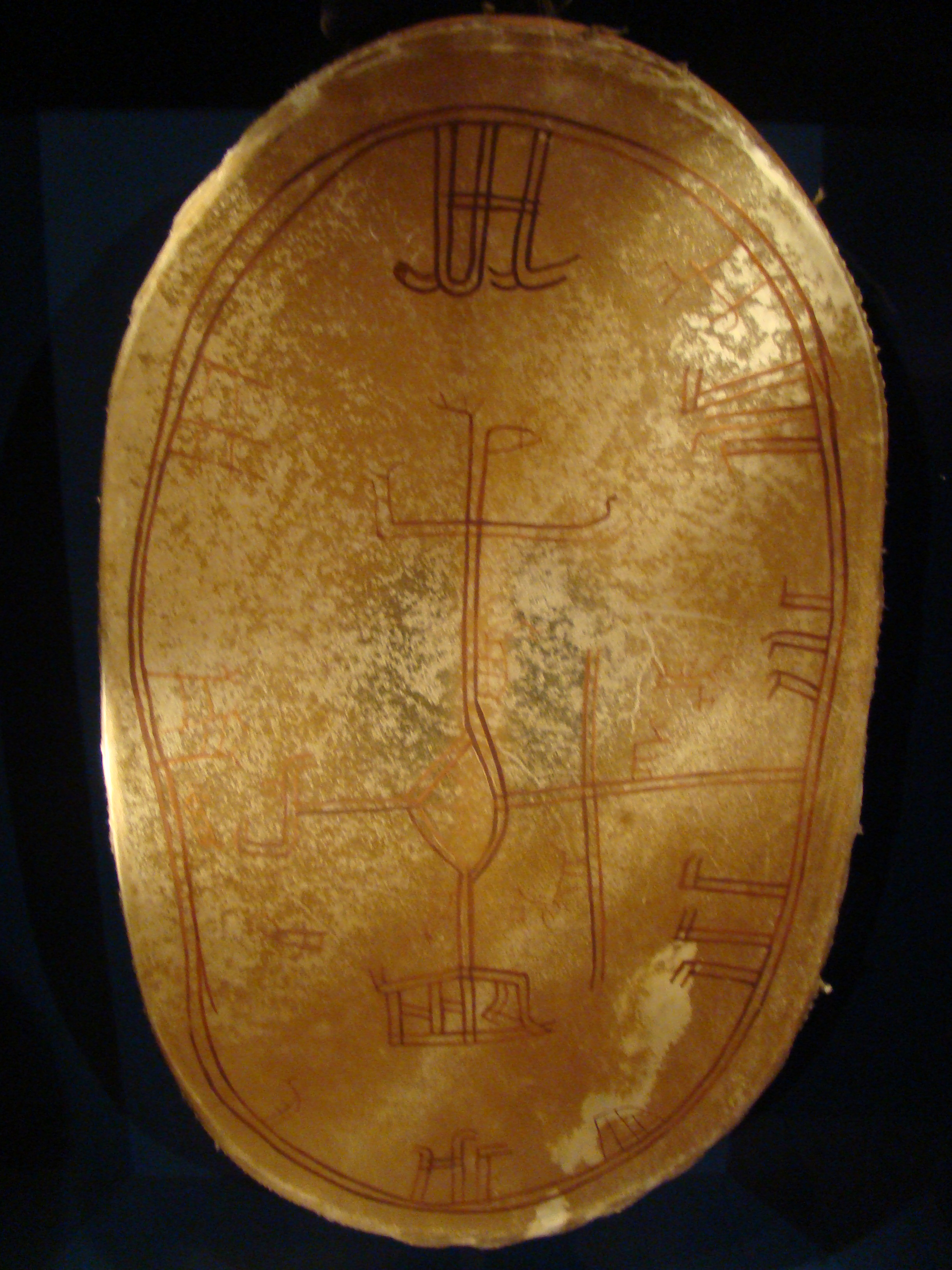
Sámi drum

Traditional Sámi spiritual practices and beliefs are based on a type of animism, polytheism, and what anthropologists may consider shamanism. The religious traditions can vary considerably from region to region within Sápmi.

Traditional Sámi religion is generally considered to be animism. The Sámi belief that all significant natural objects (such as animals, plants, rocks, etc.) possess a soul, and from a polytheistic perspective, traditional Sámi beliefs include a multitude of spirits. Sámi traditional beliefs and practices commonly emphasizes veneration of the dead and of animal spirits. The relationship with the local animals that sustain the people, such as the reindeer, are very important to the kin-group.

== Deities and animal spirits ==
Aside from bear worship, there are other animal spirits such as the Haldi who watch over nature. Some Sámi people have a thunder god called Horagalles. Rana Niejta is "the daughter of the green, fertile earth". The symbol of the world tree or pillar, which reaches up to the North Star and is similar to that found in Finnish mythology, may also be present.

Laib Olmai, the forest spirit of some of the Sámi people, is traditionally associated with forest animals, which are regarded as his herds, and he is said to grant either good or bad luck in hunting. His favour was so important that, according to one author, believers said prayers and made offerings to him every morning and every evening.

== Sieidis ==
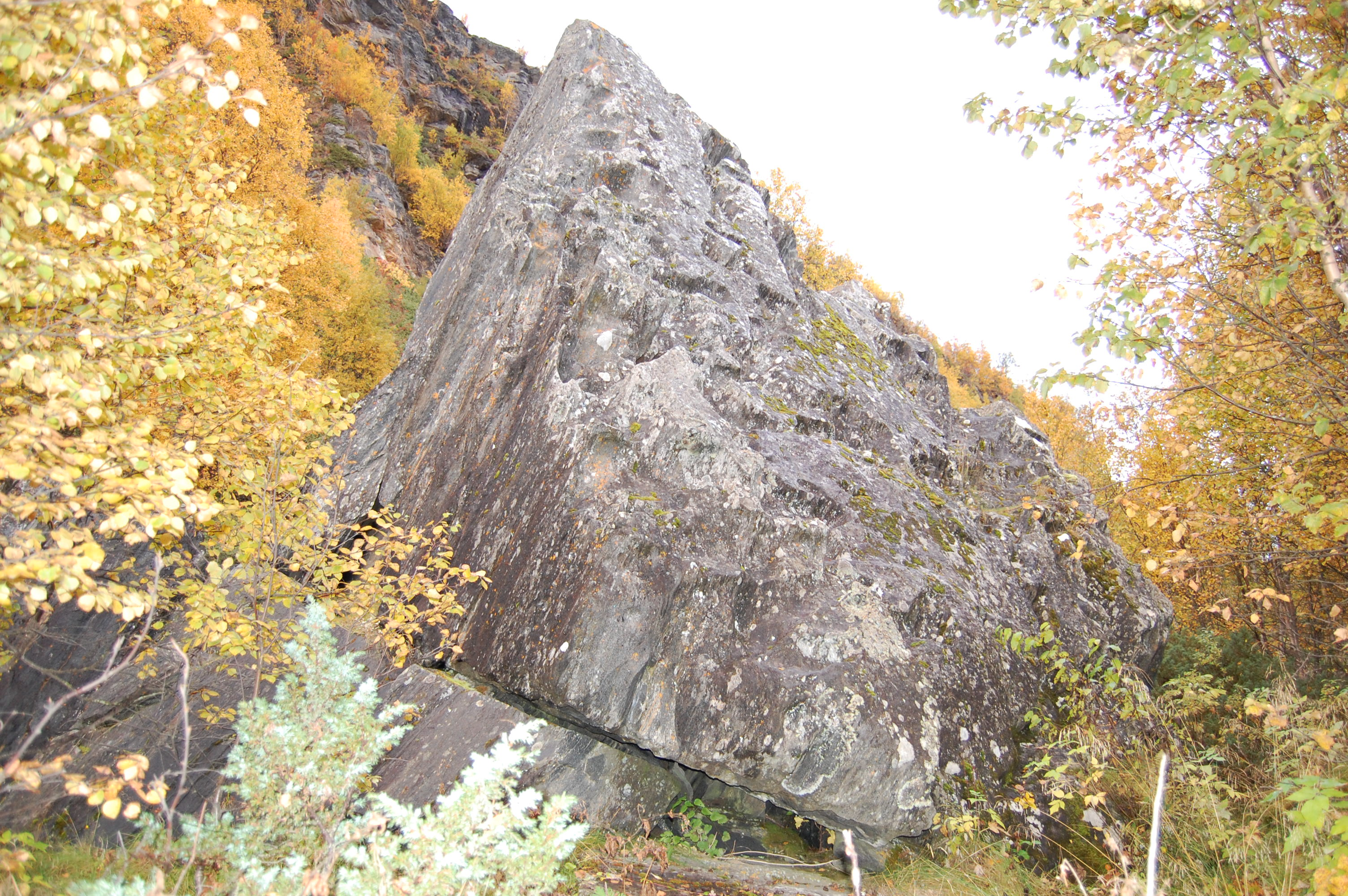
Stabben: A sieidi stone in Balsfjord Municipality

In the landscape throughout Northern Scandinavia, one can find sieidis, places that have unusual land forms different from the surrounding countryside, and that can be considered to have spiritual significance. Each family or clan has its local spirits, to whom they make offerings for protection and good fortune. The Storjunkare are described sometimes as stones, having some likeness to a man or an animal, that were set up on a mountain top, or in a cave, or near rivers and lakes. Honor was done to them by spreading fresh twigs under them in winter, and in summer leaves or grass. The Storjunkare had power over all animals, fish, and birds, and gave luck to those who hunted or fished for them. Reindeer were offered up to them, and every clan and family had its own hill of sacrifice.

== Noaidi ==
A noaidi is a mediator between the human world and saivo, the underworld, on the behalf of the community, usually using a Sámi drum and a domestic flute called a fadno in ceremonies.

== Ancestors ==
One of the most irreconcilable elements of the Sámi's worldview from the missionaries’ perspective was the notion "that the living and the departed were regarded as two halves of the same family." The Sámi regarded the concept as fundamental, while Protestant Christian missionaries absolutely discounted any possibility of the dead having anything to do with the living. Since this belief was not just a religion, but a living dialogue with their ancestors, their society was concomitantly impoverished.

== List of deities ==
The Sami religion differs somewhat between regions and tribes. Although the deities are similar, their names vary between regions. The deities also overlap: in one region, one deity can appear as several separate deities, and in another region, several deities can be united in to just a few. Because of these variations, the deities can be somewhat confused with each other.

The main deities of the Sami were as follows:

- Áhkká - a group of fertility goddesses, including Maderakka, Sarakka, Juksakka and Uksakka
- Beaivi - goddess of the sun, mother of human beings. However, in some areas the sun is male
- Bieggagallis - husband of the sun goddess, father of human beings
- Bieggolmai 'Man of the Winds' - god of the winds
- Biejjenniejte - goddess of healing and medicine, daughter of the Sun, Beaivi
- Horagalles - god of thunder. His name may mean "Thor-man". He is also called "Grandfather", Bajanolmmai, Dierpmis, Pajonn and Tordöm.
- Jahbme akka - the goddess of the dead, and mistress of the underworld and the realm of the dead
- Ipmil 'God' - adopted as a native name for the Christian God (see the related Finnish word Jumala), also used for Radien-attje
- Lieaibolmmai - god of the hunt and of adult men
- Madder-Attje - husband of Maderakka and father of the tribe. While his wife gives newborns their bodies, he gives them their souls.
- Mano, Manna, or Aske - god of the moon
- Mubpienålmaj - the god of evil, influenced by the Christian Satan
- Radien-attje - Creator and high god, the creator of the world and the head divinity. In Sámi religion, he is passive or sleeping and is not often included in religious practice. He created the souls of human beings with his spouse. He was also called Waralden Olmai.
- Raedieahkka - wife of the high god Radien-attje. She created the souls of human beings with her spouse.
- Rana Niejta - spring goddess, the daughter of Radien-attje and Raedieahkka. Rana, meaning "green" or by extension "fertile", was a popular name for Sámi girls.
- Radien-pardne - the son of Radien-attje and Raedieahkka. He acts as the proxy of his passive father, performing his tasks and carrying out his will.
- Ruohtta - god of sickness and death. He was depicted riding a horse.
- Stallo - feared cannibal giants of the wilderness, similar to the Nordic trolls.
- Tjaetsieålmaj - "the man of water", god of water, lakes and fishing

== See also ==
- Christianization of the Sámi people
- Finnic mythologies
- Fragments of Lappish Mythology
- History of Scandinavia
- Indigenous religions of Norway
- Lars Levi Laestadius
- Religion among the Sámi people
- Sarnaism
- Siberian Shamanism
