= Goahti =

Traditional, usually transportable building associated with the culture of Sami people

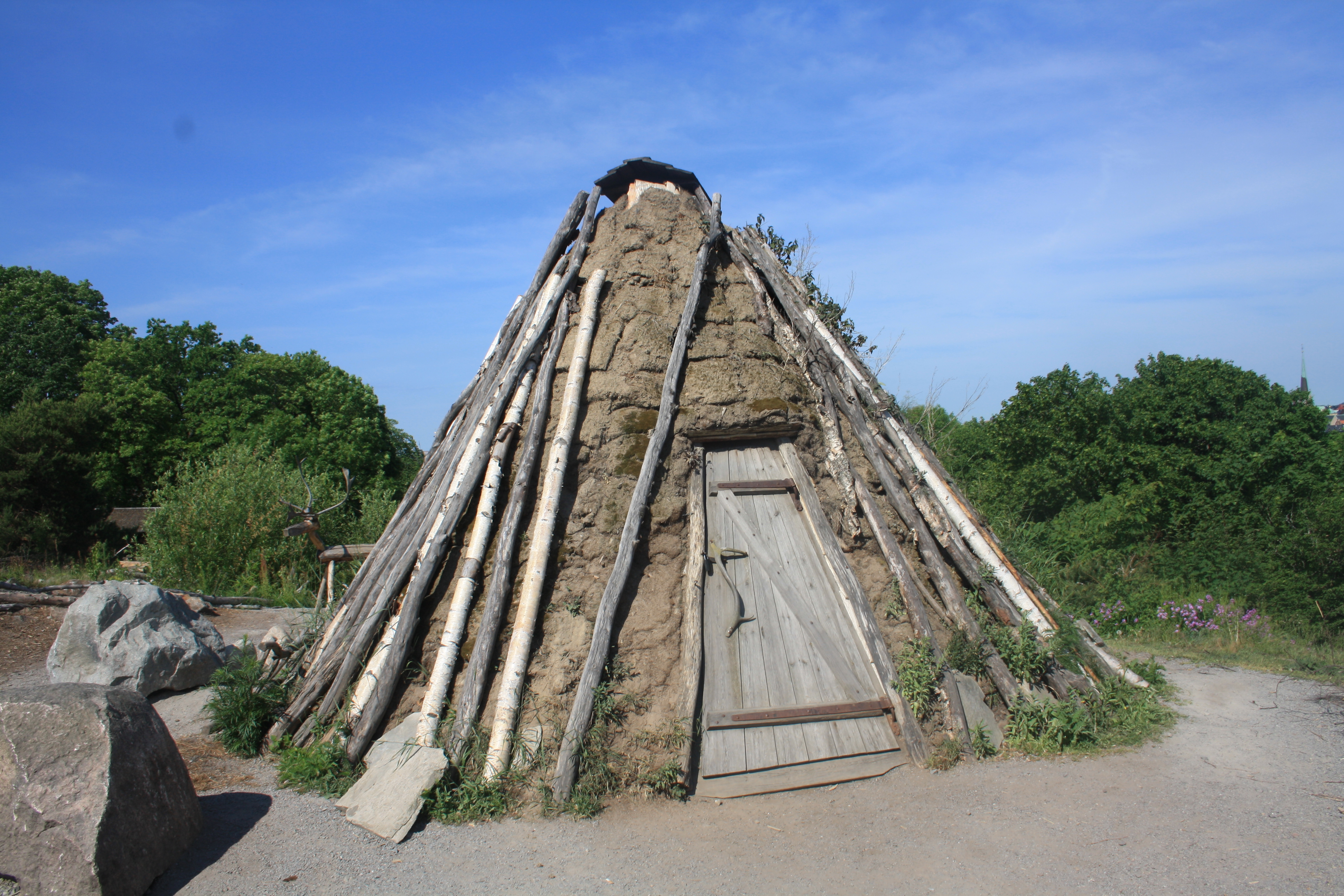
Reconstruction of a peat goahti at Skansen open-air museum

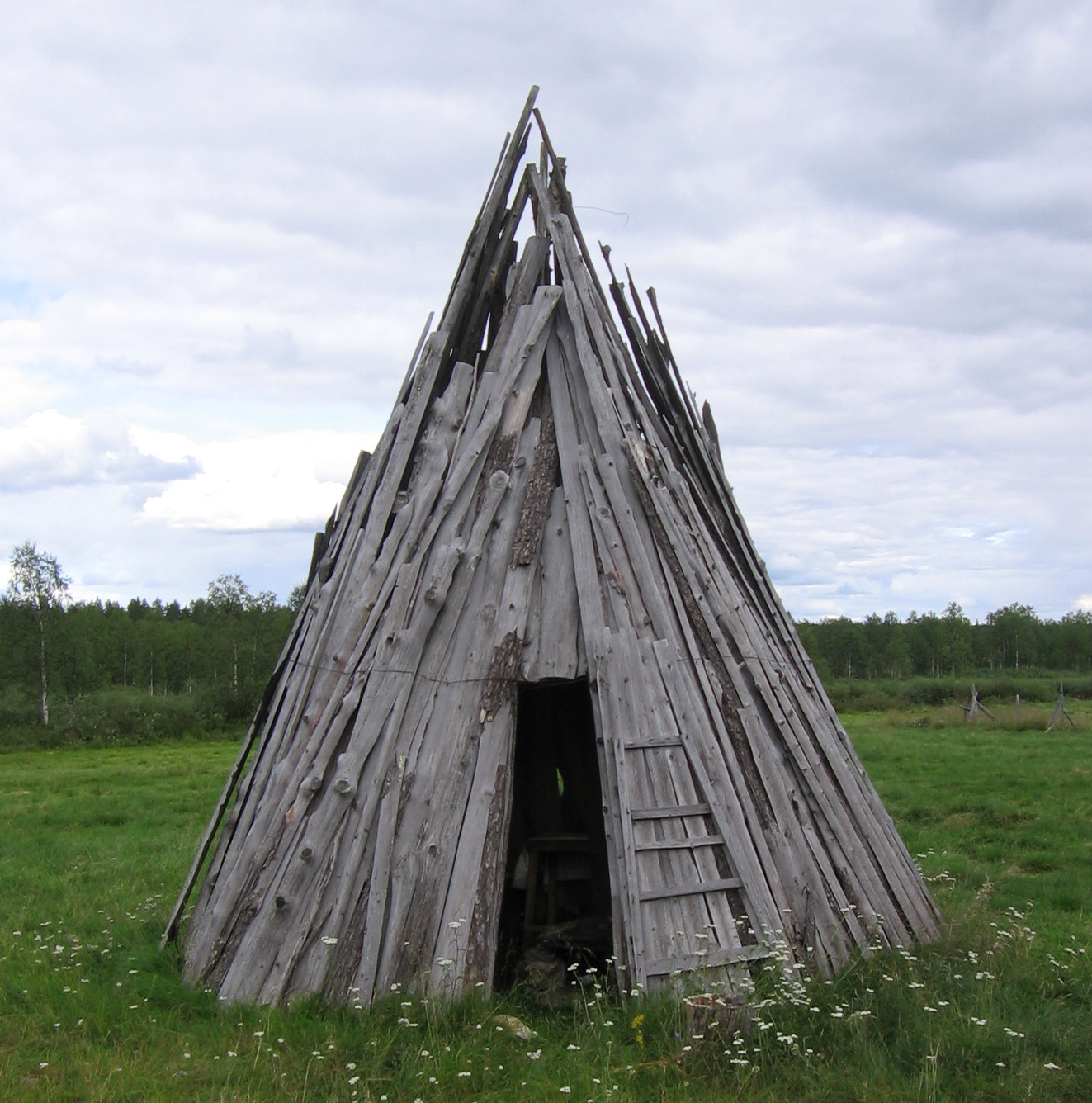
A reconstruction of a wooden goahti

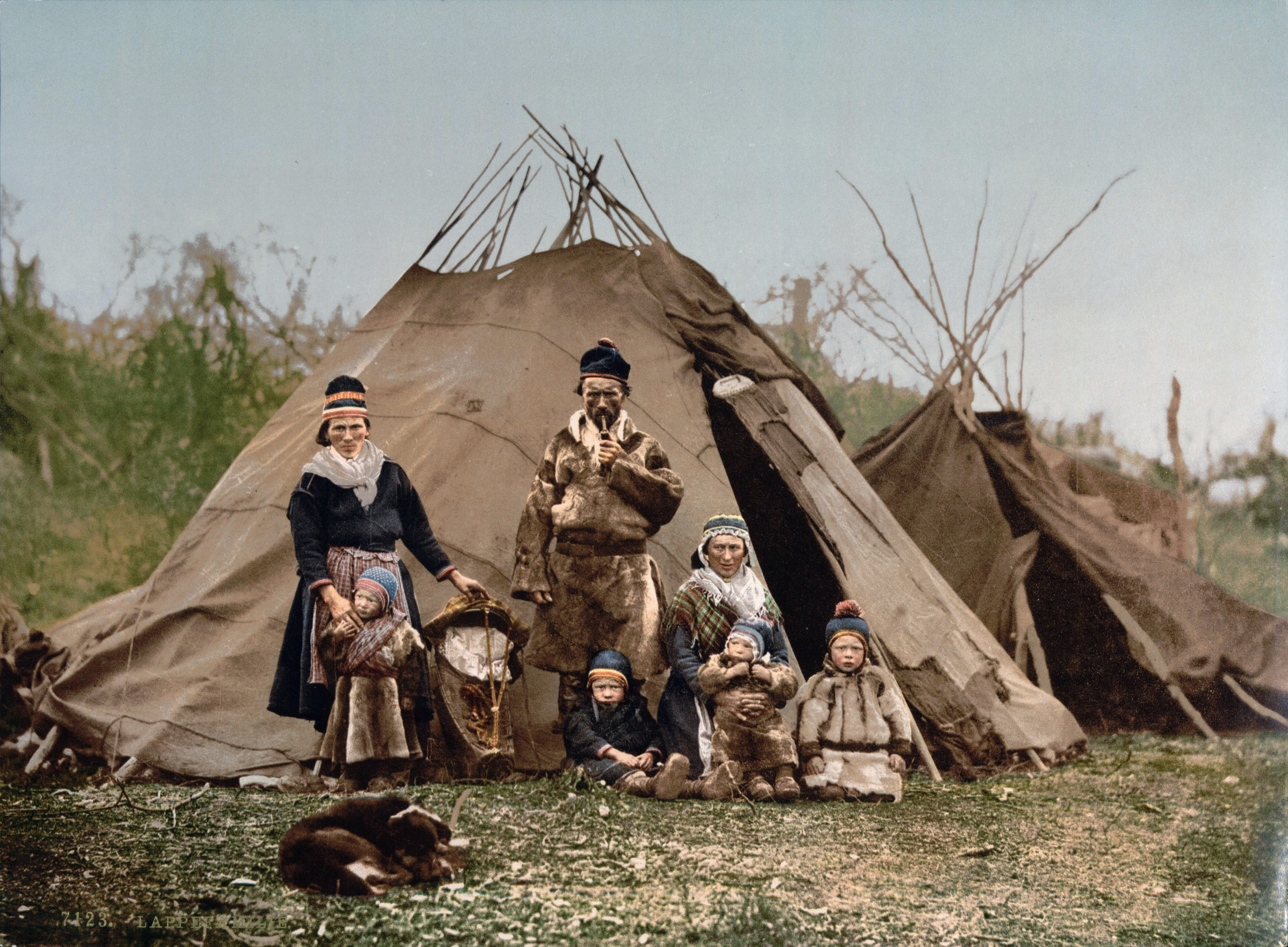
A Sami family in front of goahti. The tent in the background is a lavvu. Note the differences in the pole placement of the two structures. This photo was taken around 1900 in northern Scandinavia.

A goahti (Northern Sámi), goahte (Lule Sámi), gåhte (Pite Sámi), gåhtie (Ume Sámi), куэдтҍ (Kildin Sámi), or gåetie (Southern Sámi), (also gábma), (Norwegian: gamme, Finnish: kota, Swedish: kåta), is a Sámi hut or tent of three types of covering: fabric, peat moss or timber. The fabric-covered goahti looks very similar to a Sami lavvu, but often constructed slightly larger. In its tent version the goahti is also called a "curved pole" lavvu, or a "bread box" lavvu as the shape is more elongated while the lavvu is in a circular shape.

== Construction ==
The interior construction of the poles is thus: 1) four poles curved at one end (8–12 feet (2.4–3.7 m) long), 2) one straight horizontal center pole (5–8 feet (1.5–2.4 m) long), and 3) approximately a dozen straight wall-poles (10–15 feet (3.0–4.6 m) long). All the pole sizes can vary considerably.

The four curved poles curve to about a 130° angle. Two of these poles have a hole drilled into them at one end, with those ends being joined together by the long horizontal center pole that is inserted by the described poles. The other two curved poles are also joined at the other end of the long pole. When this structure is set up, a four-legged stand is formed with the long pole at the top and center of the structure. With the four-legged structure standing up to about five to eight feet in height, approximately ten or twelve straight "wall-poles" are laid up against the structure. The goahti covering, today made usually of canvas, is laid up against the structure and tied down. There can be more than one covering that covers the structure.

The differences between the goahti and the lavvu can be seen when looking at the top of structures. A lavvu will have its poles coming together, while the goahti will have its poles separate and not coming together.

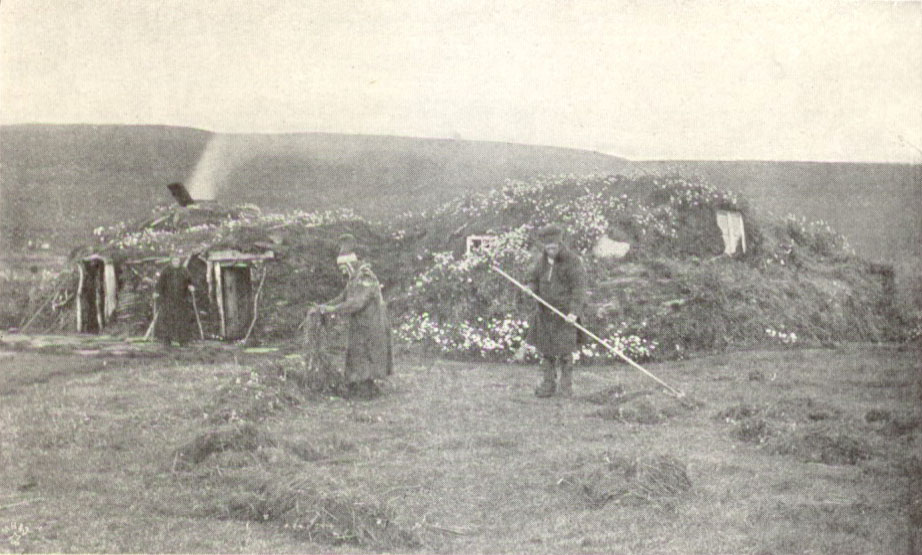
Peat goahti from Eastern Finnmark. Late 19th century.

The turf version of the goahti will have the canvas replaced with wood resting on the structure covered with birch bark then peat to provide a durable construction.

== Transportation and usability ==
Traditionally, the Sami transported the whole disassembled structure by having their domesticated reindeer being used as a pack animal to carry or drag the poles while following their reindeer herd. Today, because of the awkward size of the curved poles, this structure is used less often by the Sami as a transportable shelter. When following their cultural tradition, the Sami more often use the Sami lavvu for their camping structure.

In the coastal areas the more resident coastal Sami used the peat goahti as a combined human living and livestock building until the Second World War.

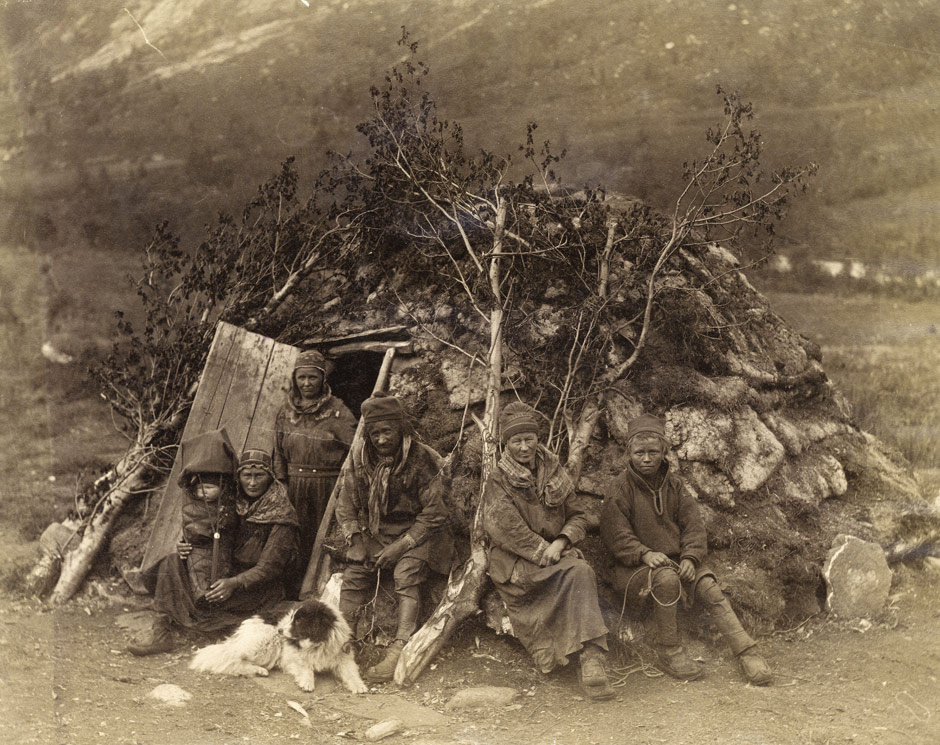
Goahti. 1870s.

== See also ==
- Lean-to
- Tipi
