= Kemi Sámi =

Extinct Sámi language

- Native to: Finland
- Region: southern Lapland (Finland)
- Extinct: 19th century
- Language family: Uralic: Sámi; Eastern Sámi; Kemi Sámi

Language codes
- ISO 639-3: sjk
- Glottolog: kemi1239
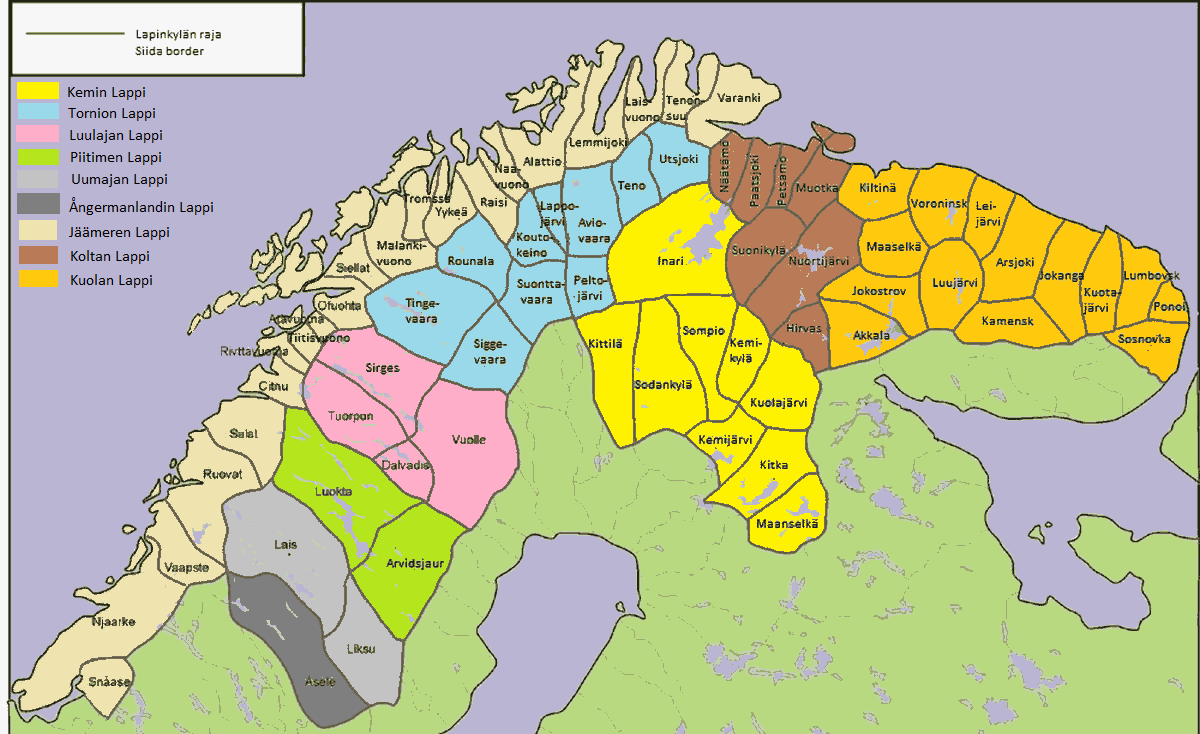
- Kemi Sámi people and language

Kemi Sámi is an umbrella label for Sámi languages that were originally spoken in the Kemi Lapland district of Finnish Lapland as far south as the Sámi siidas around Kuusamo.

Extinct now for over 100 years, few written examples of Kemi Sámi survive. Johannes Schefferus's Lapponia from 1673 contains two yoik poems by the Sodankylä Sámi Olof (Mattsson) Sirma, "Kúlnasats niråsam" and "Morse faurog". A short vocabulary was written by the Finnish priest Jacob Fellman in 1829 after he visited the villages of Salla (Kuolajärvi until 1936) and Sompio.

== Sample texts ==
The following translation of the Lord's Prayer still survives, assumedly recorded in the Sompio dialect, although dn (in "ädnamest") is a feature resembling Northern Sámi:

Lord's Prayer, village of Sompio (Sodankylä)

Äätj miin, ki lak täivest.
Paisse läos tu nammat.
Alda pootos tu väldegodde.
Läos tu taattot nou täivest, ku ädnamest.
Adde miji täb päiv miin juokpäiv laip.
Ja adde miji miin suddoit addagas, nou ku miieg addep miin velvolidäme.
Ja ale sääte miin kjäusaussi.
Mutto tjouta miin pahast.
Tälle tu li väldegodde, vuöjme ja kudne ijankaikisest.
Amen.

This is Sirma's first poem, "Kúlnasats niråsam", a Sámi love story which he sang to spur on his reindeer so that they will run faster:

Kemi Sámi
Swedish
English

Kulnasatz, niråsam, ängås
Joå oudas Jordee skådhe
nurta wåta wålgesz skådhe.
Abeide kockit laidiede,
Faurågåidhe sadiede.

Ällå momiaiat kuckan, kaigawarre,
patså buårest källueiaure tuun,
Mådhe påti millasan,
kaiga wånaide waiedin.

Ågå niråma buårebåst,
nute åtzån sargabåst.
Taide sun monia lij aigåmasz
sarågåin uålgatamasz

josz iuå sarga åinasim
kiurasam katzesim.
Kulnasasz, nirasam,
kätze, åinakåsz tun su salm.

Kulnasatj, min lilla vaja!
Det är tid för oss att fara,
ge oss av åt nordanskogen,
skynda över stora myrar,
färdas till de fagras hem.

Håll mig ej länge, Kajgavare,
far nu väl, du Kälvejaure!
Mycket rinner mig i hågen,
när jag far på Kajgas vik.

Ränn nu raskare, min vaja,
så att vi dess förr må hinna
fram till den som Sarak sände,
ödet ämnade åt mig.

Ack, att snart jag såge henne,
finge titta på min älskling!
Kulnasatj, min lilla vaja,
ser du hennes ögon nu?

Kulnasatj, my little cow!

It is time for us to travel,
to leave for the northern forest,
to hurry over great bogs,
to travel to the home of the admirable.

Do not detain me long, Kajgavare,
farewell, Kälvejaure!
Many thoughts are on my mind,
when I travel on Kaiga bay.

Hurry now swift one, my cow,
so that before that we may be on time
at that which Sarak sent,
the fate intended for me.

Alas, that soon I saw her,
let me look at my darling!
Kulnasatj, my little cow,
do you see her eyes now?

Swedish translation by Björn Collinder. English version proofread by Christopher Forster

This is Sirma's second poem, "Morse faurog", the one he sang when he was far away from his love to prize her beauty.

Kemi Sámi
Swedish
English

Pastos päivä Kiufwrasist Jawra Orre Jaura,
Jos koasa kirrakeid korngadzim
Ja tiedadzim man oinämam Jaufre Orre Jawre
Man tangasz lomest lie Sun lie,
Kaika taidä mooraid dzim Soopadzim,
Mack taben sadde sist uddasist.
Ja poaka taidä ousid dzim karsadzin,
Mack qwodde roannaid poorid ronaidh.

Kulckedh palvaid tim Suuttetim,
Mack kulcki woasta Jaufrä Orre Jaufrä.
Jos mun tåckå dzim kirdadzim Såäst worodze Såäst.
Ä muste lä Såä dziodgä Såä,
maina tåckå kirdadzim.

Äkä lä Julgä Songiaga Julgä, äkä lä Siebza
fauron Siebza, Maan koima lusad
dzim norbadzim.
Kalle Ju läck kucka madzie wordamadzie
Morredabboid dadd päiwidad, linnasabboid
dadd Salmidadd, liegäsabboid waimodadd.
Jus kuckas Sick patäridzick,
Tanngtied sarga dzim iusadzim.
Mi os matta lädä Sabbo karrassabbo
Ku lij paddä, ia salwam Route salwam,
Käck dziabräi siste karrasistä.
Ja käsä mijna täm Oiwitäm, punie poaka
tämä Jurdäkitämä. Parne miela
Piägga miela, Noara Jorda kockes Jorda.
Jos taidä poakaid läm kuldäläm,
Luidäm radda wära radda.
Oucta lie miela oudas waldäman,
Nute tiedam pooreponne oudastan man kauneman.

Må solen lysa varmt på Ekorrvattnet!
Ifall jag stege överst upp i granen
och visste att jag såge Ekorrvattnet,
där hon dväljs i ljungen,
skulle jag fälla alla dessa träden
som här ha vuxit upp på sista tiden;
jag skulle skräda alla dessa grenar,
som bära vacker grönska.

Jag lät mig drivas av de lätta molnen,
som färdades på väg mot Ekorrvattnet.
Jag flöge gärna dit med kråkans vingar,
men jag har inte ens fått knipans vingar
att flyga med dit bort;

ej heller gåsens vingar eller fötter
att ta mig fram till dig.
Visst har du väntat, dina bästa dagar,
med dina milda ögon, med ditt varma hjärta

Ifall så vore, att du flydde fjärran,
skulle jag ändå hinna fatt dig snart.

Vad finns det som kan vara hårdare
än band av senor eller kedjor
som strama hårt, som fjättra huvudet,
förvrida tankarna.

Gossens sinne är vindens sinne,
den unges tankar äro långa tankar.
Ifall jag lyssnar på dem alla,
då slår jag in på orätt väg.
Jag måste välja mig en enda håg
att jag må hitta vägen.

May the sun shine warm on the Red Squirrel Water!

If I climb up the ladder to the top in a spruce tree
and knew I were looking at the Red Squirrel Water,
where she dwells in the heather,
I would cut down all these trees
as this have sprung up recently;
I would mince all these branches,
which bear beautiful greenery.

I let myself be driven by the light clouds,
which traveled on the road to the Red Squirrel Water.
I happily fly there with crow wings,
but I have not even got a common goldeneye's wings
to fly over there;

nor goose wings or feet
to make my way to you.
Sure, you awaited, your best days,
with your gentle eyes, with your warm heart

If it were, that you fled afar,
I would still catch up with you soon.

What is it that can be harder
than bands of tendons or chains
as tight hard, which bind the head,
distort thoughts.

The boy's sense is the wind's sense,
the young person's thoughts are long thoughts.
If I listen to them all,
then I will turn into the wrong road.
I have to choose me a sole mind
that I may find the pathway.

Swedish translation by Björn Collinder

== See also ==
- Sámi people
- Akkala Sámi language
- Kildin Sámi language
- Sápmi
- Colonialism
- Extinct language
