= Olaus Sirma =

Sámi poet and priest (c. 1655 – 1719)

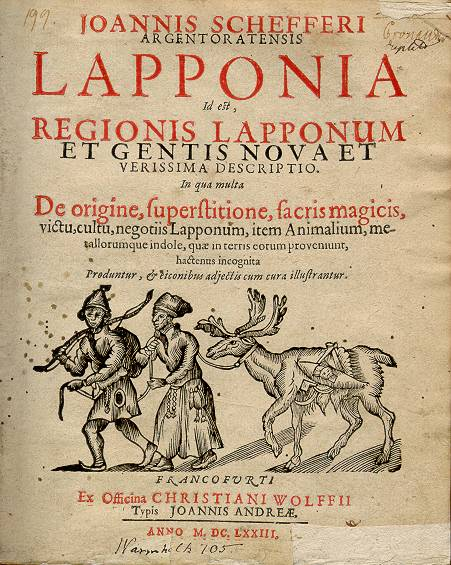
Cover of the book Lapponia

Olaus Matthiae Lappo-Sirma (Ca. 1655, probably in Soađegilli – 1719 in Eanodat, Finnish Lapland, Sápmi) was a Sámi priest and the first Sámi poet known by name to posteriority. His most well-known work is the poem Moarsi favrrot, which Henry Wadsworth Longfellow alluded to in his poem "My Lost Youth".

== Education and priesthood ==
Olaus Sirma went to school in Duortnus, and later attended University of Uppsala further south in Sweden. Sirma was one of the few Sámi students at Uppsala who did not come from the Sámi schools of Liksjoe or Biŧon. Following his education, Sirma served as a priest from 1675 until his death in Eanodat. Olaus Sirma translated the catechism of Johannes Gezelius to his native Kemi Sámi, a now extinct Sámi language. He applied to have it printed in 1688 and in 1716, but did not receive funds. The book was printed only in 1913.

== Poetry ==
In addition to his ecclesiastical work, Sirma served as a source for Johannes Schefferus when the latter wrote his book Lapponia (1673). Among Sirmas many contributions were the lyrics to two joiks. These two joiks, which were love poems, were translated to Latin in Lapponia, and later spread as Schefferus' book was translated into other languages. A line from one of these joiks, Moarsi favrrot ("My beautiful girlfriend"), also known as Oarrejávri ("Squirrel Lake"), was alluded to and quoted by Longfellow in his poem "My Lost youth" (1855).

In the following is the original, a translation to English, and Longfellow's poem, with the quoted passage in italics.

Kemi Sámi

Pastos päivä Kiufwrasist Jawra Orre Jaura,
Jos koasa kirrakeid korngadzim
Ja tiedadzim man oinämam Jaufre Orre Jawre
Man tangasz lomest lie Sun lie,
Kaika taidä mooraid dzim Soopadzim,
Mack taben sadde sist uddasist.
Ja poaka taidä ousid dzim karsadzin,
Mack qwodde roannaid poorid ronaidh.

Kulckedh palvaid tim Suuttetim,
Mack kulcki woasta Jaufrä Orre Jaufrä.
Jos mun tåckå dzim kirdadzim Såäst worodze Såäst.
Ä muste lä Såä dziodgä Såä,
maina tåckå kirdadzim.
Äkä lä Julgä Songiaga Julgä, äkä lä Siebza
fauron Siebza, Maan koima lusad
dzim norbadzim.

Kalle Ju läck kucka madzie wordamadzie
Morredabboid dadd päiwidad, linnasabboid
dadd Salmidadd, liegäsabboid waimodadd.
Jus kuckas Sick patäridzick,
Tanngtied sarga dzim iusadzim.
Mi os matta lädä Sabbo karrassabbo
Ku lij paddä, ia salwam Route salwam,
Käck dziabräi siste karrasistä.
Ja käsä mijna täm Oiwitäm, punie poaka
tämä Jurdäkitämä

Parne miela Piägga miela,
Noara Jorda kockes Jorda.
Jos taidä poakaid läm kuldäläm,
Luidäm radda wära radda.
Oucta lie miela oudas waldäman,
Nute tiedam pooreponne oudastan man kauneman.

English

Let the sun shine warmly on the lake, on Squirrel Lake
Were I to climb a high pine tree
and know that I would see the lake, Squirrel Lake
where she dwells, in the heather
Then I would cut down all those trees
which have recently sprung up here
and I would cut off all these branches
which carry greenery, pretty greenery

I would let my self be carried by the light clouds,
that drifted towards the lake, towards Squirrel Lake,
if I could fly there with wings, crow wings.
But I have no wings, no goldeneye's wings,
to fly there.
Neither do I have feet, the goose's feet, or its wings
its beautiful wings, to take myself
to you.

And you have waited so long
Your best days, your gentle
eyes, your warm heart.
Were you to flee,
I would catch up quickly.
What can be stronger
than rope, rope made from tendons, and chains of iron
that tighten so hard
and pull our heads, twist all
our thoughts.

A boy's mood is the wind's mood,
the thoughts of youth are long thoughts.
Were I to listen to all of them,
I would walk onto the wrong path.
One mood only must I choose
to better know how to find my way.

Longfellow's poem

Often I think of the beautiful town
That is seated by the sea;
Often in thought go up and down
The pleasant streets of that dear old town,
And my youth comes back to me.
And a verse of a Lapland song
Is haunting my memory still:
"A boy's will is the wind's will,
And the thoughts of youth are long, long thoughts."

I can see the shadowy lines of its trees,
And catch, in sudden gleams,
The sheen of the far-surrounding seas,
And islands that were the Hersperides
Of all my boyish dreams.
And the burden of that old song,
It murmurs and whispers still:
"A boy's will is the wind's will,
And the thoughts of youth are long, long thoughts."

I remember the black wharves and the slips,
And the sea-tides tossing free;
And Spanish sailors with bearded lips,
And the beauty and mystery of the ships,
And the magic of the sea.
And the voice of that wayward song
Is singing and saying still:
"A boy's will is the wind's will,
And the thoughts of youth are long, long thoughts."

I remember the bulwarks by the shore,
And the fort upon the hill;
The sunrise gun, with its hollow roar,
The drum-beat repeated o'er and o'er,
And the bugle wild and shrill.
And the music of that old song
Throbs in my memory still:
"A boy's will is the wind's will,
And the thoughts of youth are long, long thoughts."

I remember the sea-fight far away,
How it thundered o'er the tide!
And the dead captains, as they lay
In their graves, o'erlooking the tranquil bay,
Where they in battle died.
And the sound of that mournful song
Goes through me with a thrill:
"A boy's will is the wind's will,
And the thoughts of youth are long, long thoughts."

I can see the breezy dome of groves,
The shadows of Deering's Woods;
And the friendships old and the early loves
Come back with a sabbath sound, as of doves
In quiet neighborhoods.
And the verse of that sweet old song,
It flutters and murmurs still:
"A boy's will is the wind's will,
And the thoughts of youth are long, long thoughts."

I remember the gleams and glooms that dart
Across the schoolboy's brain;
The song and the silence in the heart,
That in part are prophecies, and in part
Are longings wild and vain.
And the voice of that fitful song
Sings on, and is never still:
"A boy's will is the wind's will,
And the thoughts of youth are long, long thoughts."

There are things of which I may not speak;
There are dreams that cannot die;
There are thoughts that make the strong heart weak,
And bring a pallor into the cheek,
And a mist before the eye.
And the words of that fatal song
Come over me like a chill:
"A boy's will is the wind's will,
And the thoughts of youth are long, long thoughts."

Strange to me now are the forms I meet
When I visit the dear old town;
But the native air is pure and sweet,
And the trees that o'ershadow each well-known street,
As they balance up and down,
Are singing the beautiful song,
Are sighing and whispering still:
"A boy's will is the wind's will,
And the thoughts of youth are long, long thoughts."

And Deering's Woods are fresh and fair,
And with joy that is almost pain
My heart goes back to wander there,
And among the dreams of the days that were,
I find my lost youth again.
And the strange and beautiful song,
The groves are repeating it still:
"A boy's will is the wind's will,
And the thoughts of youth are long, long thoughts."

== See also ==
- Kemi Sámi language. The article reproduces Sirma's two joik lyrics in full.
- Lapponia, the book by Johannes Schefferus.
- Sámi school (Sweden) for more information about the school system where Sirma got his education.
- Henry Wadsworth Longfellow
