= Dislocation of Sámi people from Jukkasjärvi and Karesuando =

20th-century forced migrations of Sámi people

Sámi people were forcibly dislocated from Jukkasjärvi and Karesuando to areas further South in Sweden in the 1920s to 1940s. In total it included 300–400 people. After Russia had closed its borders, first to Norway in 1852 followed by Finland in 1888, the cross-border reindeer herding became a conflict between the countries. Guided by racist ideas of the Sámi as a dying people and reindeer herding as a dying practice, the Norwegian government worked towards colonising the North of Norway with farmers. Gradually the Sámi's rights to graze in Sweden during wintertime and in Norway in the summers was restricted. The start of the dislocation was the reindeer grazing convention of 1919, which drastically limited the amount of reindeer within Norway. In practice, it meant that the Sámi were robbed of their homes and grazing land within Norway. Following this, the county administrative board by various means of force made Sámi families relocate from their homes to new unknown lands further South.

== Background ==
This was mostly a result of political disagreements between Norway and Russia. Russia wanted the right to keep on fishing in Norwegian fjords but this was denied by Norway. In 1852 Russia answered by cutting off all relationships with Norway, causing regions in the Torne Valley (on the Finnish-Russian side) to be excluded from the Norwegian Sámi's traditional pasture lands and vice versa. About 400 individuals from Kautokeino Municipality in Norway then started to change nationality to Swedish and settled in the parish of Karesuando in Sweden, simply to gain access to previous pasture regions in Finland, since Russia allowed Swedish Sámi to enter Finland. This lasted until 1889, when Russia closed the border between Sweden and Finland also for Swedish Sámi.

== Dislocation ==
=== First movements ===
After the pasture in Karesuando became exhausted, which happened very quickly due to many of the families who left Kautokeino having very large herds, some of the original families of Karesuando and some of Kautokeino moved to the parishes of Jukkasjärvi, Gällivare, and Jokkmokk. Among these were Johan Turi. These first migrations were by their own choice.

=== Forced relocation ===
In 1919, Norway and Sweden wrote a new convention about reindeer pasture areas. This led to the four northernmost Sámi villages losing their right to pasture in Norway. As the herds grew and the situation became worse, the Swedish parliament decided that the number of reindeer in Karesuando should be decreased or else moved. Most herders refused to cut down their herd and the authorities decided to move some families from Karesuando by force. In the early 1920s several families and 10,000s of reindeer were moved. Most of them to Arjeplog and Jokkmokk in south Norrbotten but also to Västerbotten particularly Tärnaby. This relocation is what most people mean when they talk about dislocation by force since those who resisted were threatened by law.

=== Third wave ===
In the 1940s, a few families moved from Karesuando to Jokkmokk and Norway. This was all by their own choice.

=== Consequences ===
Since the Northern Sámi were different from the Sámi originally living in the areas to which they moved, based on their different cultural practices and dialects, great controversy emerged. Most of the conflicts were centered around reindeer herding since the North Sámi were used to other conditions and had different methods of herding. When the authorities intervened, they were unable to solve the problems; however they sided with the North Sámi, claiming that they were more primitive – an opinion possibly based on clear racism. These conflicts between the original users of the land and the newcomers still divide the Sámi in the area today.

== See also ==
- Sámi history
- High Arctic relocation
- Territorial claims in the Arctic
- Political migration
- Thule relocation
- Environmental racism in Europe
