= Kornsjø =

Village in Halden municipality, Norway

Coordinates: 58°58′0″N 11°39′0″E

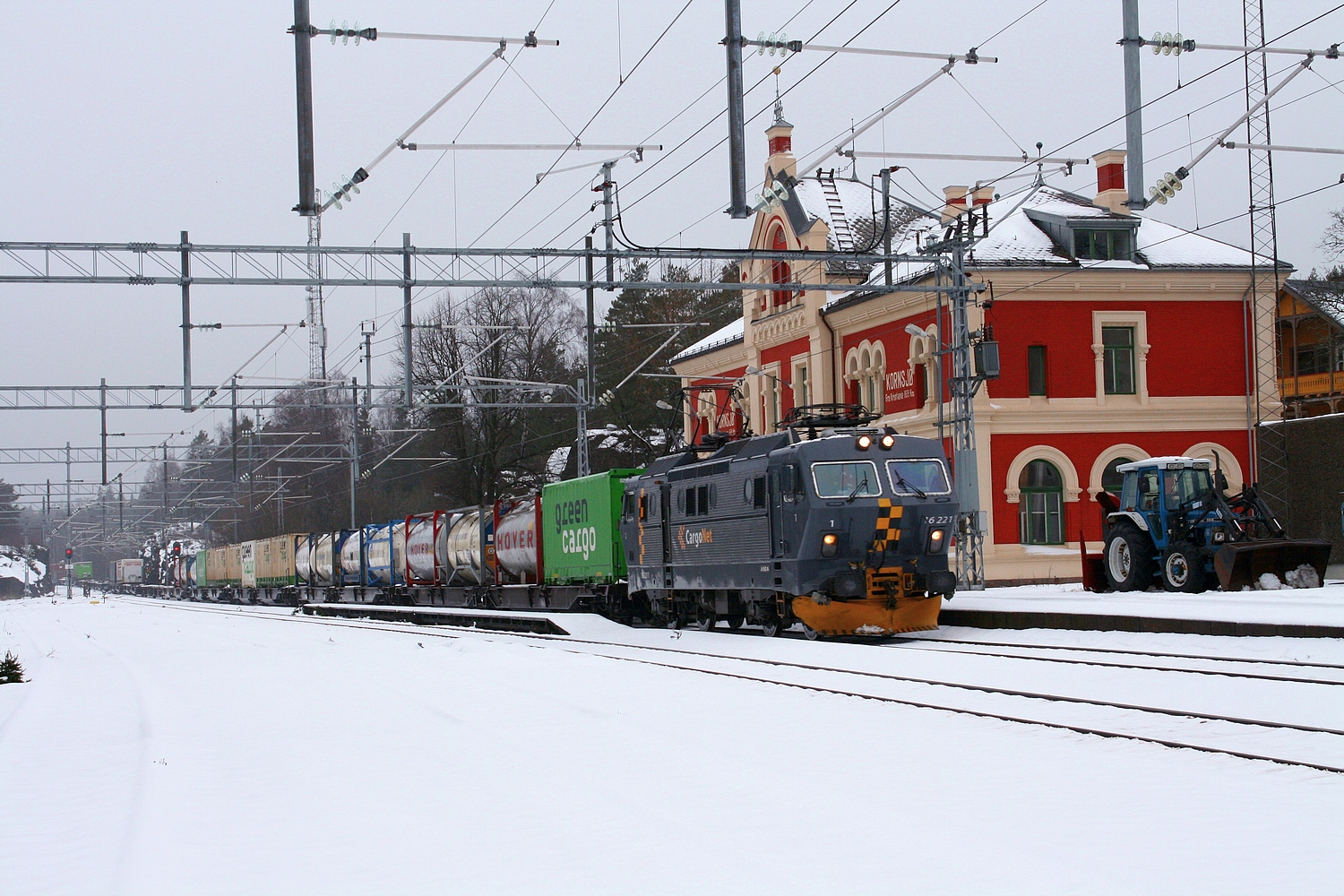
CargoNet freight train passing through Kornsjø Station

Kornsjø is a village in Enningdalen in Halden, Norway on the border to Sweden. The village has 250 residents (2001). At Kornsjø is the border crossing for the railway lines the Østfold Line (Norway) and the Norway/Vänern Line (Sweden). Previously, change of crew was performed at Kornsjø Station, but this has since been closed.
