= Kornsjø Station =

Railway station in Halden, Norway

Kornsjø
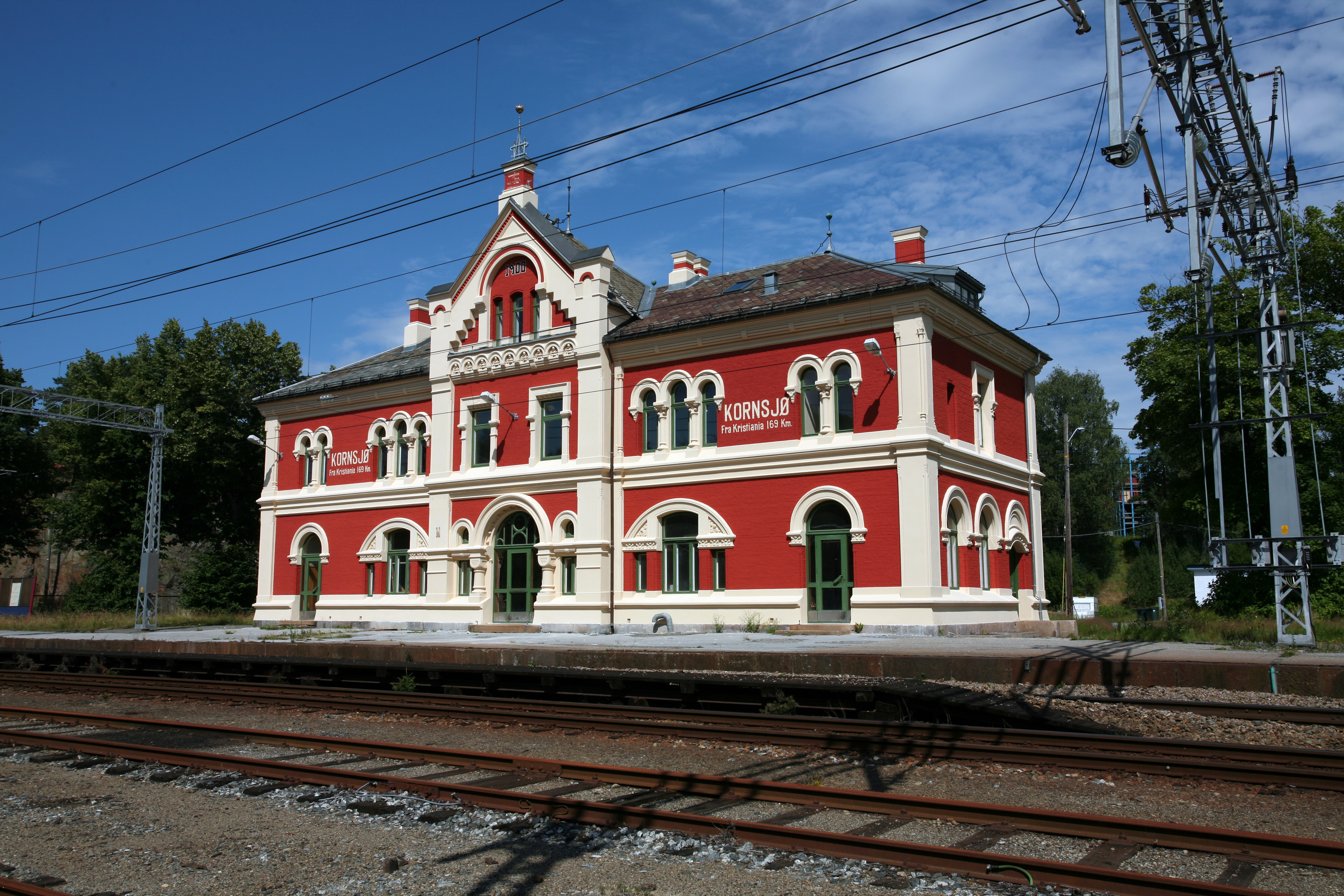

General information
- Location: Kornsjø, Halden; Norway
- Coordinates: 58°56′28″N 11°39′35″E
- Lines: Østfold Line; Norway/Vänern Line
- Distance: 169.20 km (105.14 mi)

Construction
- Architect: Paul Due

Other information
- Station code: KO

History
- Opened: 1879
Location

Kornsjø Station (Norwegian: Kornsjø stasjon, Swedish: Kornsjö järnvägsstation) is a railway station located at Kornsjø in Halden, Norway, on the Østfold Line. The station is located 1 kilometre (0.62 mi) from the Norway–Sweden border and was opened in 1879 for changing crew on international trains between Sweden and Norway and for the customs office. The building was destroyed by fire in 1898 and a new larger stone building was built. The restaurant was taken over by Norsk Spisevognselskap from 1 August 1924, but was then privatized from 1932. The signal equipment connected to the station is fully Norwegian, but some of it is located on the Swedish side.

The station is no longer used, since international trains do not change crew any longer, and occasional customs checks are made in the train by staff based elsewhere. The village has just 250 inhabitants and the trains do not stop.

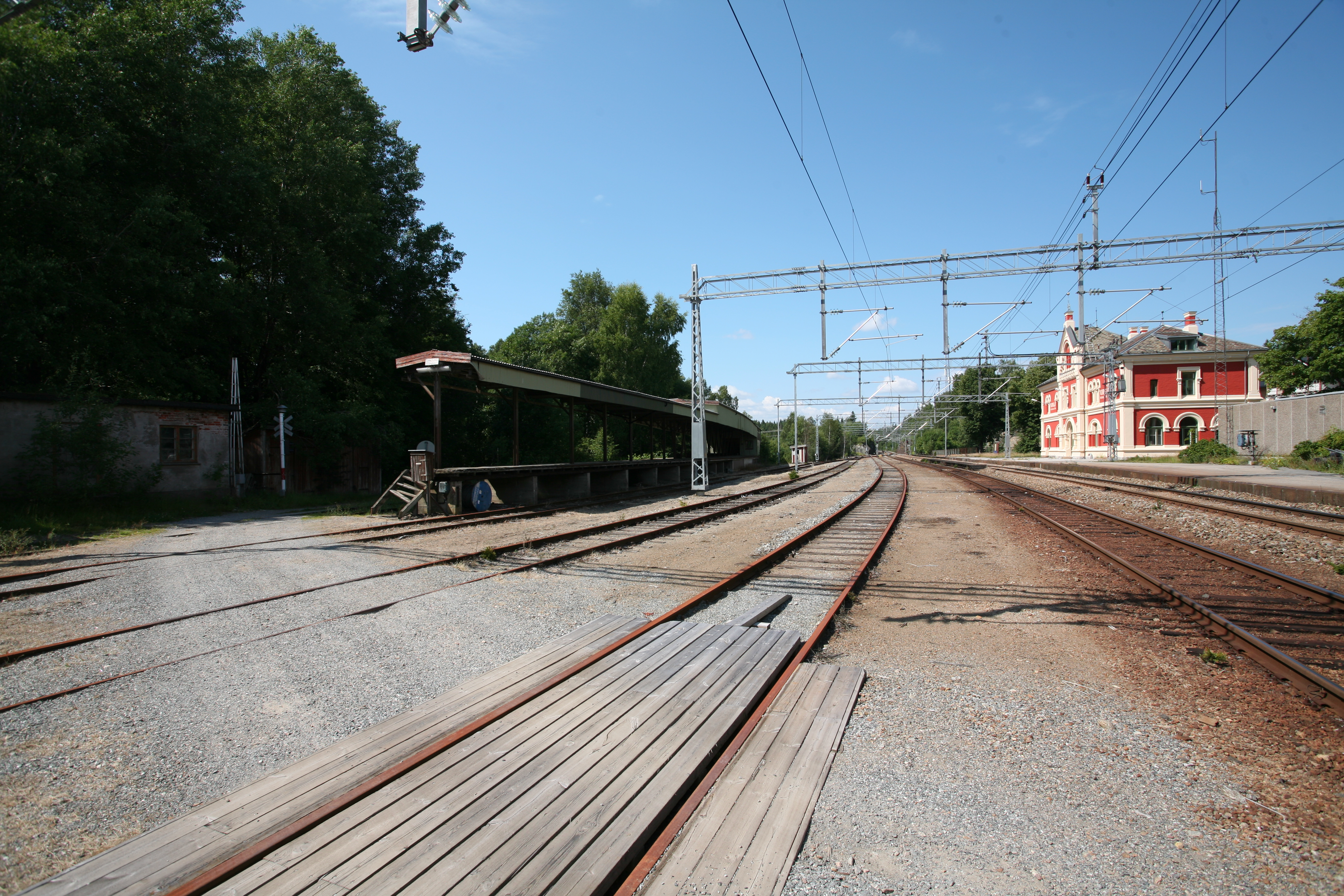

Preceding station		Following station
Halden	Østfold Line	Terminus
Terminus	Norway/Vänern Line	Ed
