= Sámi school =

Type of school in Sweden

Sámi schools, which were referred to as Nomad schools or Lapp schools before 1977, are a type of school in Sweden that runs parallel to the standard primary school system. Sámi schools are part of the Swedish public school system, and as such are governed by the same curriculum that primary schools are. Sámi schools are state-owned educational institutions that are open to all children whose parents identify as Sámi. Each school has its own dormitory that many students live in for large parts of the academic year due to the long distances in the north of Sweden.

Teaching takes place in both Swedish and Sámi, which is also taught separately. The Sámi schools have a small number of students. The schools are located in Karesuando, Lannavaara, Kiruna, Gällivare and Jokkmokk in Norrbotten County and in Tärnaby in Västerbotten County. Grades 1-6 are taught everywhere but Gällivare, where only grades 7-9 are taught. Some municipalities in Lapland do not have their own Sámi school, so they have integrated Sámi teaching at the primary school level and native-language education in Sámi when it can be arranged. The Sami Education Board (Swedish: Sameskolstyrelsen) in Jokkmokk has been responsible for the Sámi schools since 1981. Board members, who are Sámi themselves, are appointed by the Sámi Parliament of Sweden.

An ordinance on nomad schools was passed in Sweden in 1913. This type of school run parallel to the primary school form prevalent at the time called folkskola. While the number of days in the academic year was the same as for the folkskola, the academic year itself was adapted to conform to the everyday life that the Sámi led at the time. During the 1940s and 1950s, the school goahti that were in use were replaced with a western-style dormitory. Up until the 1950s, nomad schools could either be mobile or be in a fixed location. After that decade, however, the mobile versions were discontinued.

== History ==
=== Sámi boys sent to Uppsala ===
King Karl IX was the first person to take the initiative to educate the Sámi in schools. While he did not found any schools in northern Sweden, he did send some Sámi boys to Uppsala to study. The king's envoy, Daniel Thordsson Hjort, was the one who actually implemented the plan. In an official letter from 1606, he talks about how he 16 Sámi boys picked out: two from Ume, four each from Pite and Lule, as well as six from Torne within Sápmi.

The latter six had been sent to the bailiff in Tornio to be transported over the water. The other ten were to be accompanied by Hjort himself, but one fell ill and had to be left behind. So there were only nine boys left that Daniel Thordsson Hjort led. When they arrived in Gnarp in Hälsingland, however, the two oldest boys ran away while a violent storm raged. Hjort had the entire parish out looking for them, but they were not able to find the two boys. The remaining seven boys were delivered to the bailiff in Gävle, where they were given Western-style clothing and shoes before they were finally settled in Uppsala. It would be Christoffer von Warnstedt, governor of Uppsala Castle, who would be ultimately responsible for their upkeep.

No one knows how the seven Sámi boys at Uppsala fared. According to an announcement from 1612, however, it transpired that the students received no compensation for their studies during the three years there were at Uppsala.

=== The Piteå Lapp school ===
In 1617, Nicolaus Andreæ, the vicar in Piteå, offered to found a school for the Sámi. This idea was supported by King Gustav II Adolf. Andreæ was from a birkarl family and knew some Sámi. Each year, six boys would be educated at the newly founded Lapp school in the hopes that some of them would eventually become priests and start working with the mission in Lappmarken. In 1619, Andreæ published a liturgy book and primer in Sámi; these were the first books to be published in the language.

When Andreæ died in 1628, the school only had three students, who stayed on to be taught by his successor, Johannes Hossius. In 1632, they transferred to the newly founded Skyttean school in Lycksele.

=== The Skyttean school in Lycksele ===
After Andreæ's death, no other priest was available who knew Sámi. As the priests lived on the coast and only made the trip up to Lappmarken a couple of times a year, they had to preach to the masses through an interpreter.

The dean in Umeå, Olaus Petri Niurenius, saw that this was a problem and discussed the matter with person councillor (Swedish: riksrådet) Johan Skytte. This resulted in a new Lapp school, the Skyttean school, being set up in Lycksele with Johan Skytte providing backing for it. The school seemed to be open already in February 1632 with two former students from the Lapp school in Piteå having joined its staff as teachers. In April, Niurenius announced that the school had eleven students. One of the main objectives was to supply academically gifted boys for the seminary, so that they could then return to work amongst their own people. In 1633, the post of Sámi catechist was established at the Skyttean school. This resulted in the majority of teaching taking place in Swedish.

The first student from the Skyttean school that was actually ordained as a priest was Olaus Stephani Graan, who became head of his old school in 1657. He wrote two books that would go on to have a major impact on the school’s program: Cathechetiska frågor, tryckte 1688 until Lapparnes undervisning, as well as an updated edition of the Manuale Lapponicum, containing Psalms and Ecclesiastes from the Old Testament, a Catechism, a psalter, and a lectionary – all in Sámi.

==== Sámi students at Uppsala ====
By 1725, a total of 14 students with a Sámi background had enrolled at the University of Uppsala. The majority of these students came from the Skyttean school in Lycksele, but some of them also had ties leading back to Andreæ in Piteå. The 14 students and the year each one enrolled at the university are as follows:

- 1633: Andreas Petri Lappo (pastor in Arvidsjaur 1640–1649. After that, he became priest at the mine at Nasafjäll, and then finally in Jokkmokk.)
- 1635: Paulus Matthiae Lappo
- 1636: Jacobus Matthiae Lappo Gråtreschensis (very likely the brother of Paulus Matthiae Lappo; attended school in Piteå and went on to become the head of the Skyttean school)
- 1660: Nicholaus Haquini Vindelius Lapponius
- 1662: Hindrichus Svenonius Lyckselius (became the first assistant vicar in Sorsele)
- 1662: Nicholaus Olai Vindelius Lappo
- 1672: Olaus Matthiae Lappo Sirma (did not attend the Skyttean school; attended a primary school in Torneå; became a priest in Karesuando)
- 1674: Nicolaus Andreae Lundius Lappo (son of Andreas Petri)
- 1676: Nicolaus Jonae Spolander Lappo
- 1688: Laurentius Rangius Lappo (successor to Henrik Svenonius in Sorsele)
- 1706: Sivardus Granbergh
- 1710: Kenicius Granlund Lappo
- 1720: Zimeon Zachariae Granmark Lappo
- 1722: Petrus Thurenius

At the same time, there were Sámi students at other institutes of higher education such as Härnösands gymnasium, which is, for example, where Olaus Stephani Graan studied.

=== Additional Lapp schools established ===
The royal decree of 1723 "Lappländarnes flitigare undervisning i kristendomen and skolars inrättande där i orten" stated that Lapp schools were to be established at each and every one of the seven main churches in Lappland. This resulted in schools being set up at Jokkmokk and Åsele in 1732, Arjeplog in 1743, Jukkasjärvi in 1744, Föllinge in 1748, Gällivare in 1756 and Enontekiö in 1813. As with the Skyttean school, which still existed, these were small schools that usually had six pupils whom the Crown provided upkeep for. The idea was that after two years in the Lapp school students would be able to start teaching other children back home.

This new decree changed the character of the Lapp schools. The new schools lacked the academic emphasis that the Skyttean school had had. Instead, these schools were two-year boarding schools at the primary level where schoolchildren were taught reading and Christianity.

These schools existed until 1820. During the last year of their existence, Åsele, Lycksele, Arjeplog, Jokkmokk and Gällivare had a ”full school”, i.e., six students and Jukkasjärvi and Karesuando had ”half” schools with three students each. As the number of pupils in the Lapp schools was so limited, catechists were used to supplement their education. Any Sámi whose children were not attending the school, but were otherwise interested, could request a catechist from their pastor. The catechist taught the family's children at home and could even spend an entire winter with one family.

The Lapp schools in Åsele, Arjeplog, Jukkasjärvi and Karesuando were closed in 1820, replaced by a new, mobile form of teaching. By this point in time, catechists were responsible for teaching the entire curriculum to an entire siida or some other larger group of Sámi.

== See also ==
- Norwegianization of the Sámi
- American Indian boarding schools
- Canadian Indian residential school system
- Cultural assimilation of Native Americans
