= Scheffer =

Scheffer is a German occupational surname related to German Schäfer (meaning "shepherd") or Schaffer (meaning "overseer"). Notable people with the surname include:

- Aaron Scheffer (born 1975), American baseball pitcher
- Ary Scheffer (1795–1858), Dutch-born French painter, son of Johann Baptist and Cornelia
- Cornelia Scheffer (1769–1839), Dutch painter and portrait miniaturist
- Cornélia Scheffer (1830-1899), French sculptor and designer
- David Scheffer (born 1953), American diplomat, UN Ambassador-at-Large for War Crimes Issues
- Emmanuel Scheffer (1924–2012), Israeli football player and coach
- François Scheffer (1766–1844), Luxembourgian politician, Mayor of Luxembourg City
- Frank Scheffer (born 1956), Dutch cinematographer
- Guus Scheffer (1898–1952), Dutch weightlifter
- Hendrik Scheffer (1798–1862), Dutch-born French painter, son of Johann Baptist and Cornelia
- Henrik Teofilus Scheffer (1710–1759), Swedish chemist
- Jaap de Hoop Scheffer (born 1948), Dutch politician, former Secretary General of NATO
- James Scheffer (born 1970), American record producer and songwriter
- Johan Scheffer (born 1948), Australian (Victorian) politician
- Johann Baptist Scheffer (1773–1809), German-born Dutch painter
- Johannes Scheffer (1621–1679), Swedish humanist
- Karl-Heinz Scheffer, West German slalom canoeist
- Marten Scheffer (born 1958), Dutch ecologist
- Paul Scheffer (born 1954), Dutch multiculturalism scholar and author
- Pi Scheffer (1909–1988), Dutch band composer and conductor
- Rudolph Herman Christiaan Carel Scheffer (1621–1679), Dutch botanist
- Victor Blanchard Scheffer (1906–2011), American mammalogist
- Will Scheffer (born 1969), American playwright

== See also ==
- United States v. Scheffer, 523 U.S. 303 (1998)
