= Lapp Codicil of 1751 =

1751 codicil defining the Norway–Sweden border and formalising Sámi grazing rights

The Lapp Codicil

1765 map of the border between Denmark-Norway and Sweden near Kautokeino parish.

Lapp Codicil of 1751 is an addendum to the Strömstad Treaty of 1751 that defined the Norwegian-Swedish border. It consists of 30 sections.

This special codicil formalised the rights of the Lapps or Sámi people to continue with their traditional migratory reindeer herding across the newly formalised border between the then Danish territory of Norway and Sweden. It also had provisions about citizenship and taxes among other things.

When Finland was ceded from Sweden to Russia, the Lapp Codicil lost its formal value along the Finland–Norway border, and in 1852, the border of Norway–Finland/Russia was closed, causing trouble for the Sami, who needed the Finnish forests for reindeer winter grazing. In 1889 Russia also closed the Finland–Sweden border. Norwegian farmers disliked the reindeer, and since most Sami south of the Norway–Finland–Sweden tripoint were Swedish, the Norwegian government tried to limit these reindeer. A treaty in 1919 limited the number of Swedish reindeer, and more in a treaty in 1972. In 2005 the validity of the 1972 treaty ended, but Norway kept it in its laws.

The codicil has been considered to guarantee Sami rights in traditional Sami areas and is still considered of importance in the debate about these rights.

In 2021, the Norwegian version of the document was moved from the National Archives of Norway in Oslo to the Sámi Archives in Kautokeino.
