= Norway–Sweden border =

International border

Coordinates: 63°20′11″N 12°3′34″E

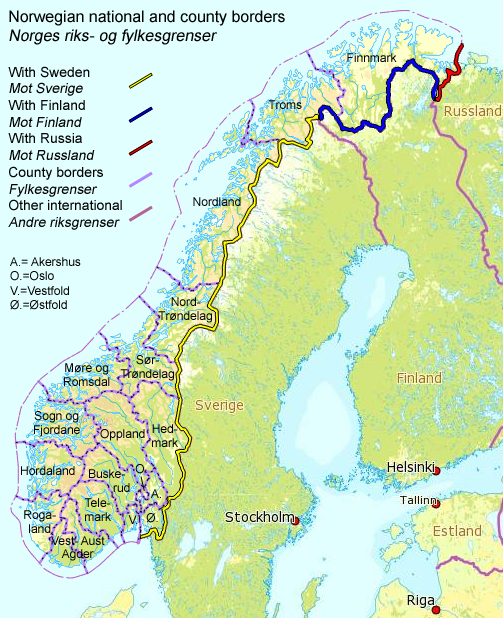
Norway's national borders Norway–Sweden border Norway–Finland border Norway–Russia border

Swedish soldier and Norwegian resistance member shake hands at the border in Hedmark/Värmland, celebrating the end of the German occupation of Norway, May 1945.

The Norway–Sweden border (Norwegian: Svenskegrensa, Swedish: Norska gränsen) is a 1,630-kilometre (1,010 mi) long land national border, and the longest border for both Norway and Sweden. It is an external border for the EU (Sweden).

== History ==
The border has changed several times because of war. Before 1645, Jämtland, Härjedalen, Idre/Särna parish, and Bohuslän belonged to Norway. The border changes were defined in the Treaty of Brömsebro (1645), the Treaty of Roskilde (1658) and the Treaty of Copenhagen (1660).

In 1751 a treaty was signed in Strömstad, defining the border based on field investigations and negotiations done 1738–1751. The border was based on knowledge among local people, mainly which farm belonged to which parish and which parish to which diocese. In the unpopulated mountains, the border mainly followed the water divide. There were disagreements on the parishes of Särna, Idre, Lierne, Kautokeino and Karasjok, which had to be solved by give-and-take. Based on that, in 1752–1765 border cairns were erected between Norway and Sweden including Finland, which mostly remain today. Since the Sami people lived in mountains and regularly crossed the border, a second treaty, the Lapp Codicil of 1751, was agreed, giving them the right to freely cross the border with their reindeer.

After the Treaty of Kiel and the Convention of Moss (1814), the union between Sweden and Norway was established, and the Norway–Sweden border became a border between two union partners. In the Negotiations in Karlstad which led up to the dissolution of the union in 1905, Norway was obliged to tear down several fortresses along the border.

During World War II, when Norway was occupied by Germany and Sweden was neutral, many Norwegians became refugees and were transported or fled over the border. The regulation of Norwegian immigrants was strict between 1940 and 1941; several would-be-refugees were declined.

== Geography ==
In Dalarna and north of it, the border usually follows the drainage divide in the Scandinavian Mountains between rivers that flow to the Norwegian Sea or Skagerrak and rivers flowing to the Baltic Sea. Exceptions to this are Rogen and Lierne, which are not located on the same side of the border as the drainage divide. South of Dalarna, the border in part follows local drainage divides, but also across lakes and along rivers. Some border marks were placed on small lake islands so that they got divided by the border. In those fairly short stretches the border follows a river, the Thalweg principle is used. This can cause a change in the course of the border, as happened in 2023 at the border between Aremark Municipality and Dals-Ed Municipality.

In Norway, the border lies along the counties, from south to north, of Østfold, Akershus, Innlandet, Trøndelag, Nordland, and Troms. In Sweden, the border lies along the counties, from south to north, of Västra Götaland, Värmland, Dalarna, Jämtland, Västerbotten and Norrbotten. The northernmost border point is Treriksröset (Swedish) or Treriksrøysa (Norwegian), which is also a border to Finland.

There is a clear-cut zone (a border vista) along the border where there are forests.

== Control ==
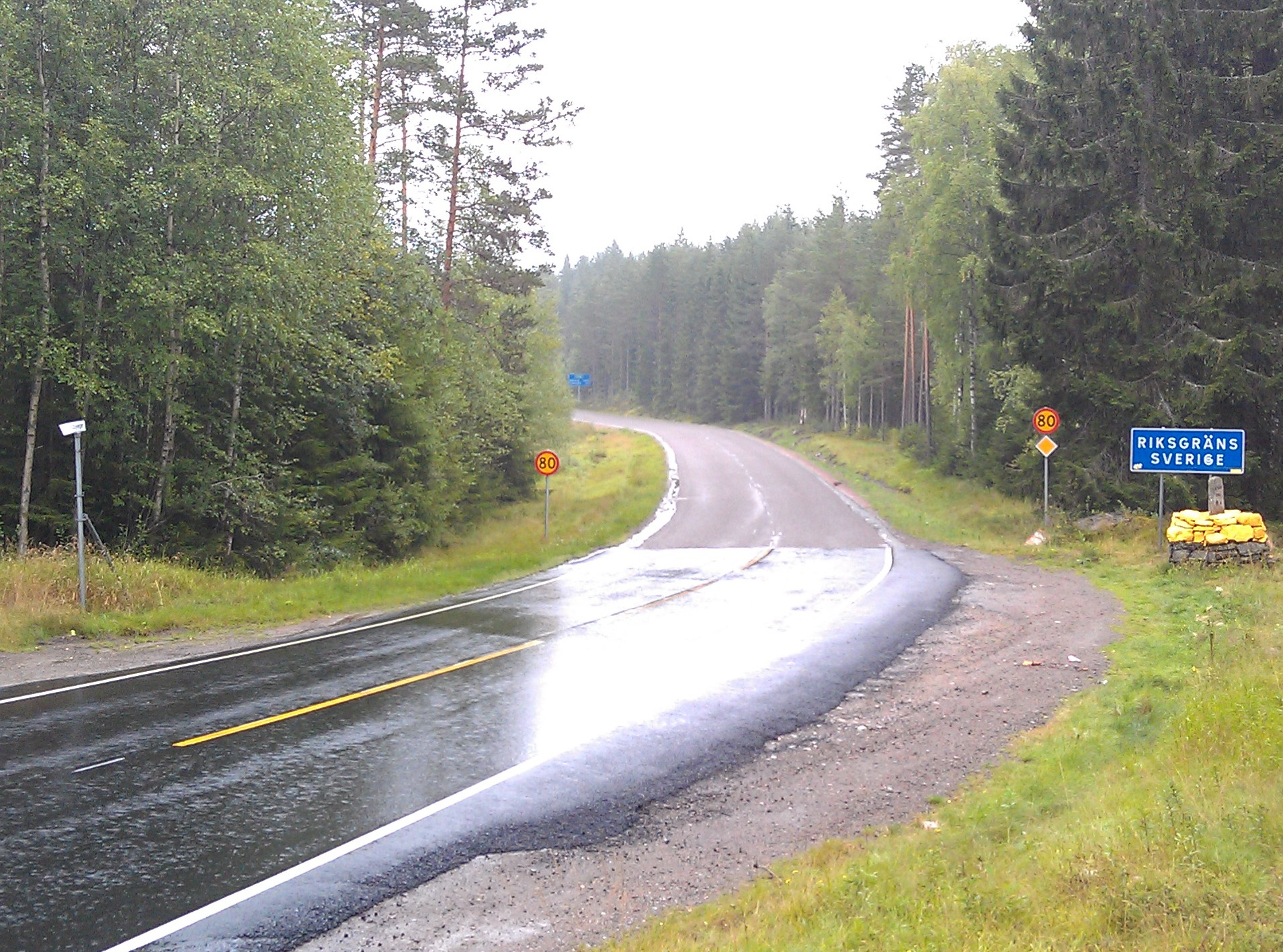
Road E16 crossing the border without customs control

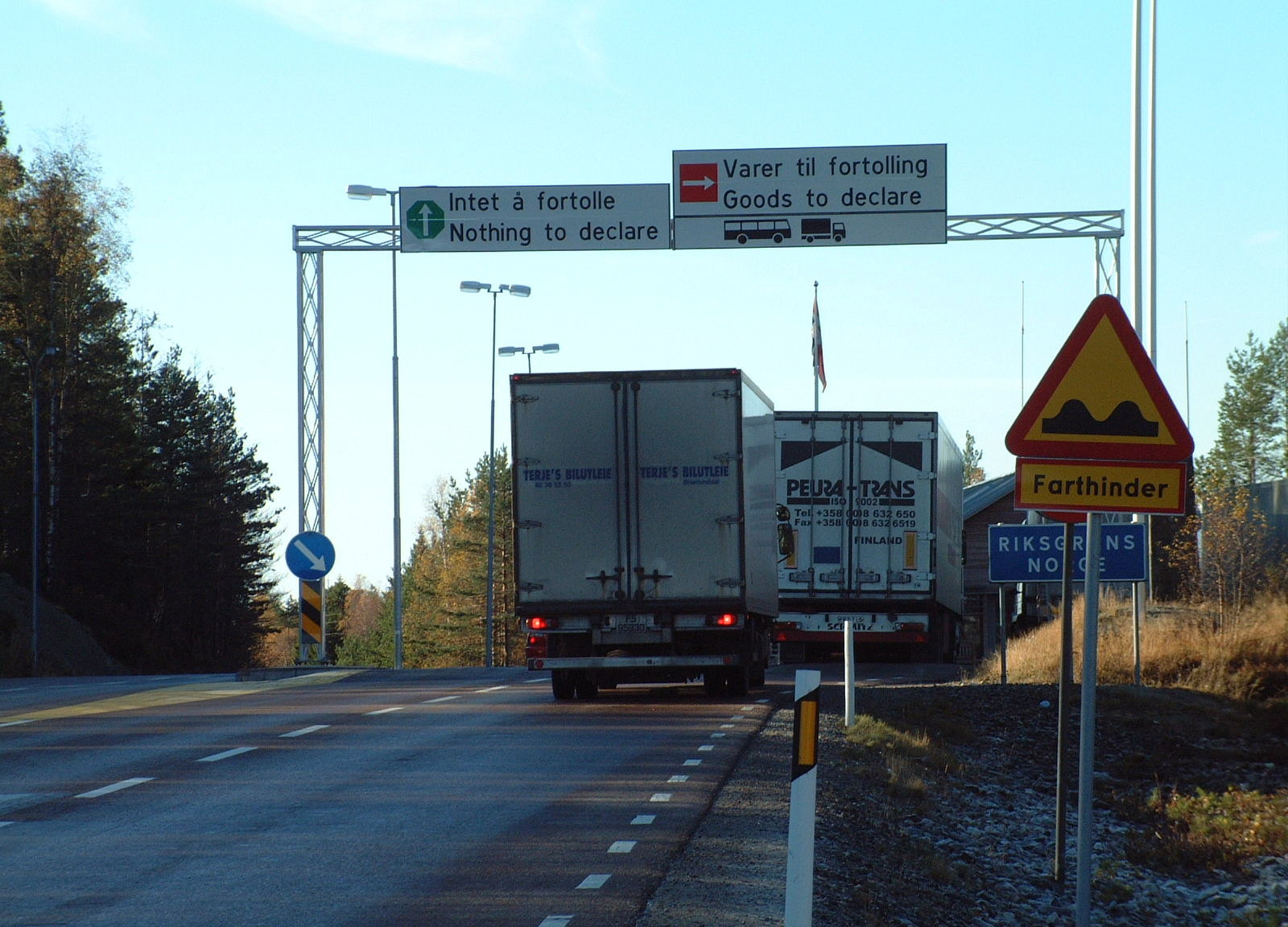
Road E18 crossing the border with customs control

Both countries are members of the Schengen Area, and there are therefore no immigration controls. However, only Sweden is part of the European Union (and crucially the European Union Customs Union) and there are customs checks between the two countries. These checks are performed by the Norwegian Customs and Excise Authorities and the Swedish Customs Service. These checks are sporadic along the Norway–Sweden border. Cars are usually not forced to stop. To combat drug smuggling, the use of CCTV surveillance has recently been increased, with systems using automatic number plate recognition being rolled out in 2016 and 2017.

Both Norway and Sweden emphasise checks against other countries. For flights and ferries between the two countries, there are no formal passport checks at airport and ferry ports and identity cards are normally not needed to board either, but are advised for planes.

Before 2001, the countries were not part of the Schengen Area, but even then there was no passport check, as both were part of the Nordic Passport Union, which was subsumed into the Schengen Area. Passengers were led to the passport control at international airports, but could pass simply by showing the ticket and/or speaking and looking Scandinavian. There were more road customs stations then, some have been closed for cost reasons.

=== Shared surveillance ===
Already in 1957 there were agreements that one country manned certain border crossings and the other one some others, checking in both directions. In 1959 the collaboration was formalised by an agreement on 28 October 1959, ratified in Sweden (K. Prop 1959:180) and finally the ratifications were exchanged between the Swedish foreign minister and the Norwegian ambassador on 30 December. On the Swedish side, the agreement was expressed as a law on 18 December (SFS 1959:590), as a royal decree (SFS 1959:591) and in an instruction from the Customs Service on 30 December (TFS 1959:255).

The basic setting was a control zone stretching 15 kilometers on each side of the border where the officers from the other country could act. So the Swedish custom officers could act in behalf of the Norwegian agency according to the Norwegian laws. They were then protected as a Norwegian civil servant. If they committed an infraction, the punishment should be handled by the Swedish authorities. The same was valid for the Norwegian custom officers.

== Road border crossings ==
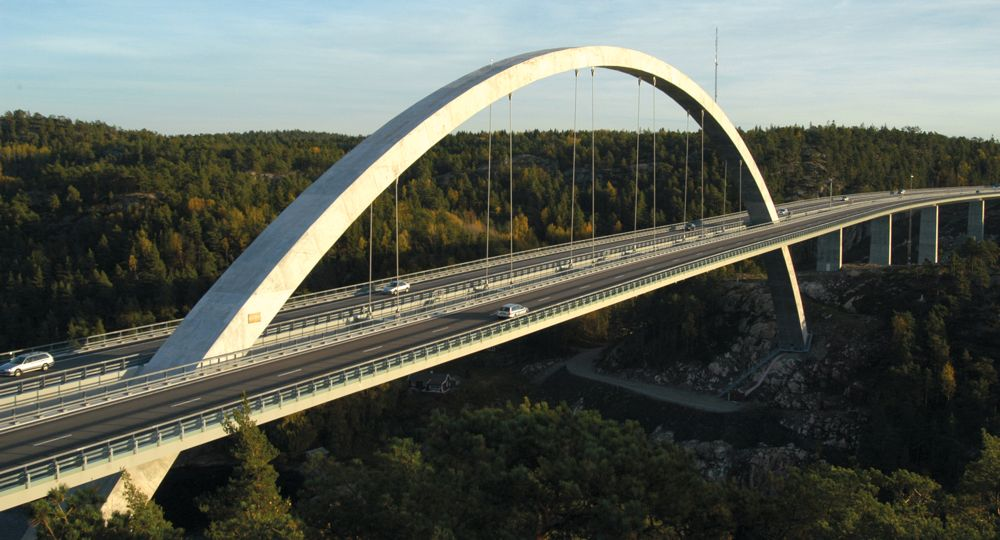
The new bridge at Svinesund on road E6, connecting Sweden and Norway

There are customs control stations at the following places (from north to south):

Place	Customs station	Road S	Road N
Björnfjell	N	E10	
Junkerdal	N	95	77
Tärnaby	S	E12	
Storlien	S	E14	
Vauldalen	N	84	31
Idre	N	70	218
Østby	N	66	25
Åsnes	N		206
Eda	N+S	61	2
Ørje/Hån	N+S	E18	
Svinesund	N+S	E6	
N=Norway, S=Sweden, N+S in both countries

For most border crossings there is one customs station on one side of the border, but for some on both sides, one for each direction. A treaty gives the customs officers of one country the right to carry out clearance and checks for both countries.

There are around 30 more roads crossing the border without the presence of customs stations (most notably E16), but it is prohibited to use these crossings while in possession of goods requiring declaration, with the exception of heavy trucks that have pre-declared their cargo. All crossings are surveilled by video cameras and are subject to temporary checkpoints.

== Railway border crossings ==
There are four railway crossings. All four serve both passenger and freight trains. All border stations except Kornsjø Station are located in Sweden.

Border station	Norwegian line	Swedish line
Riksgränsen	Ofoten Line	Iron Ore Line
Storlien	Meråker Line	Central Line
Charlottenberg	Kongsvinger Line	Värmland Line
Kornsjø	Østfold Line	Norway/Vänern Line

Norway has right hand traffic and Sweden has left hand traffic on double track railways. All four crossings are single track however, which does not present a problem. After the introduction of automatic train control in the 1980s, drivers can easily get permission to drive on the other side of the border. Before this the border stations were used for changing train crews.

== Riksrøysa/Riksrösen ==
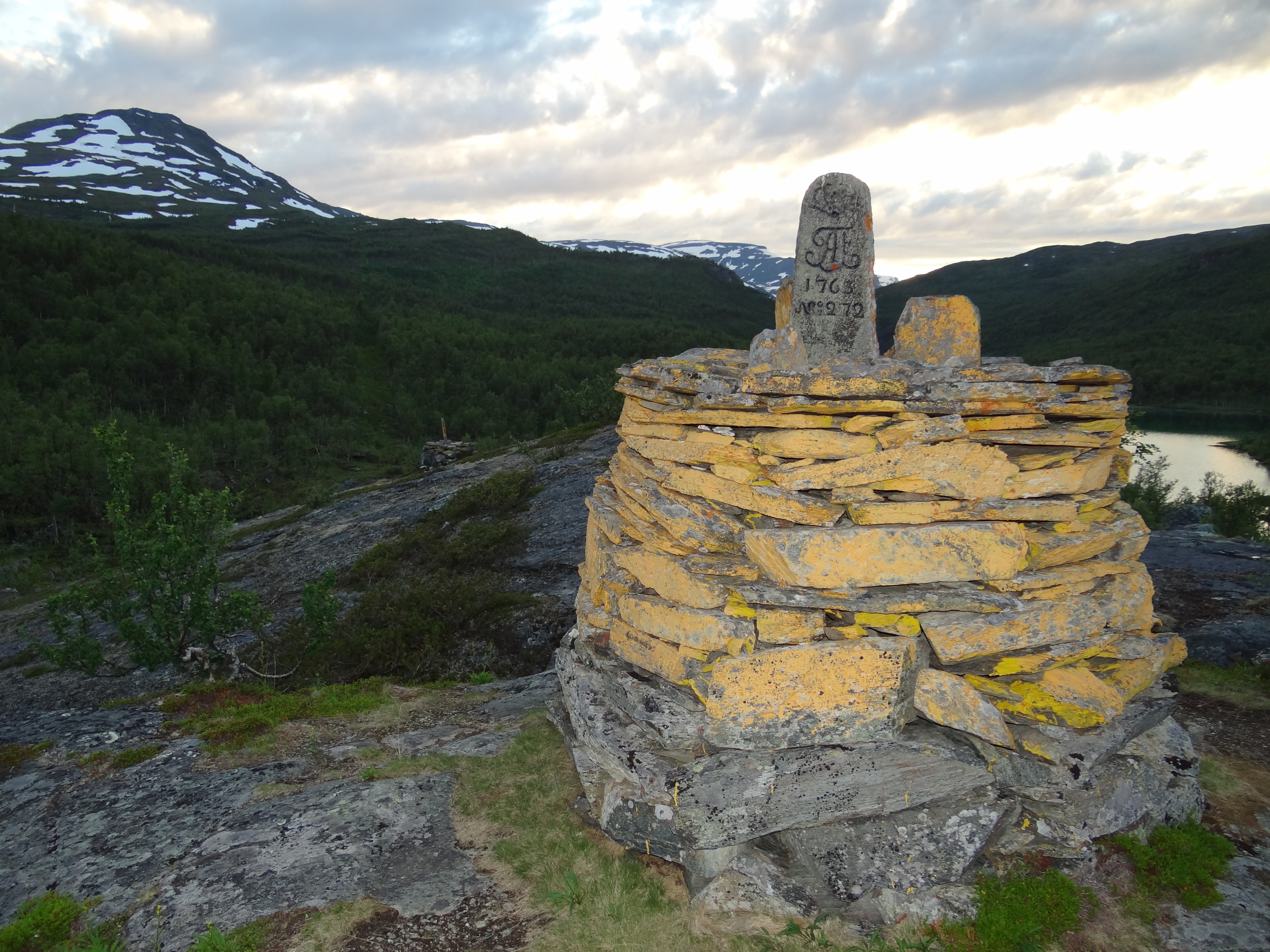
The Riksrøysa/Riksrösen divide Norway and Sweden

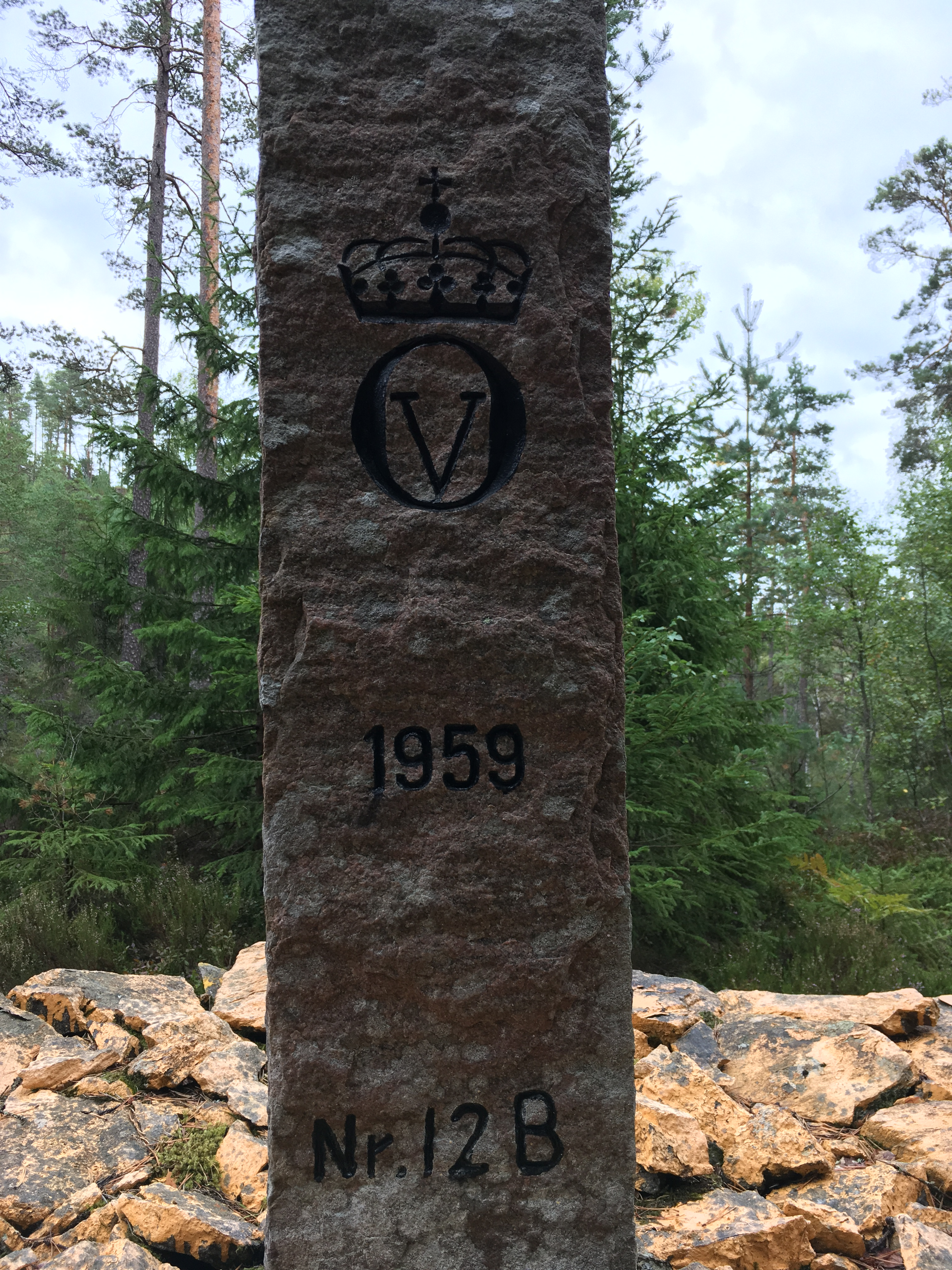
Border marker between Sweden and Norway

Stone cairns, known as the Norwegian: Riksrøysa and Swedish: Riksrösen, mark many parts of the border.

== Biological exchange ==
Animals, notably wolves and brown bear, have been known to wander across the border. Reflecting the fact that the population is shared, a Norwegian–Swedish research project named Skandulv was founded in 2000, and is administered by the Norwegian Institute for Nature Research, Hedmark University College and the Swedish University of Agricultural Sciences.

== See also ==
- Borders of Norway
- Finland–Sweden border
- Finland–Norway border
- Norway–Russia border
