= Lapponia (book) =

1673 book by Johannes Schefferus

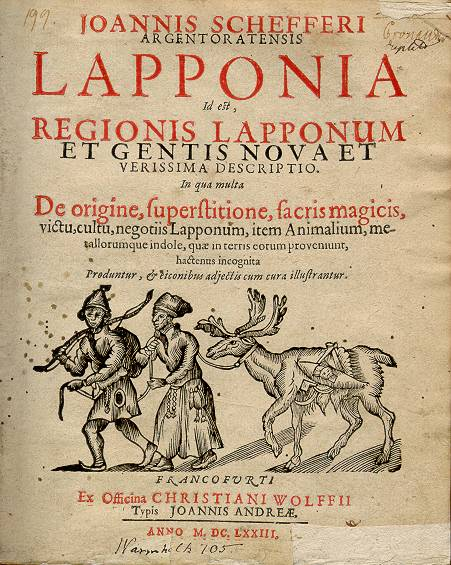
Title page of Lapponia

Lapponia is a 1673 book written in Latin by Johannes Schefferus (1621–1679), offering a comprehensive account of Northern Scandinavia. It covers the region's geography, environment, and the living conditions of the Sámi people, including their dwellings, clothing, gender roles, hunting practices, child-rearing, shamanism, and pagan religion. The 1674 English translation is titled The History of Lapland.

== Publication history ==
The book was originally published in late 1673 and followed by translations to English in 1674, to German in 1675, French in 1678, and Dutch in 1682. Adapted and abridged versions followed, where only the original chapters on shamanism and religion were preserved, the others being replaced by tales of magic, sorcery, drums and heathenism.

The book was not fully translated into Swedish (as Lappland, Acta Lapponica 8, Uppsala 1956) until 1956. Its references are, however, based on "clergy correspondence", that is, reports made by priests.

== User of the term Lap ==
The book uses "Lap" mainly to notice that Sámi are still pagan and it is concluded that Lap is a word introduced by the Danish historian Saxo Grammaticus (ca. 1150–1220) to distinguish Sámi peoples living near the ocean (coast-fenni) and in the woodland (lapp-fenni).

== Rumors about Sami magic ==
It was aimed to meet rumors, or as the councillor Magnus De La Gardie saw it, degrading propaganda, from particular German pamphlets claiming the Swedes had used "Sami magic" on European battlefields.

== See also ==
- Sápmi
- Olaus Sirma, who acted as one of Schefferus' informants.
