= Johannes Schefferus =

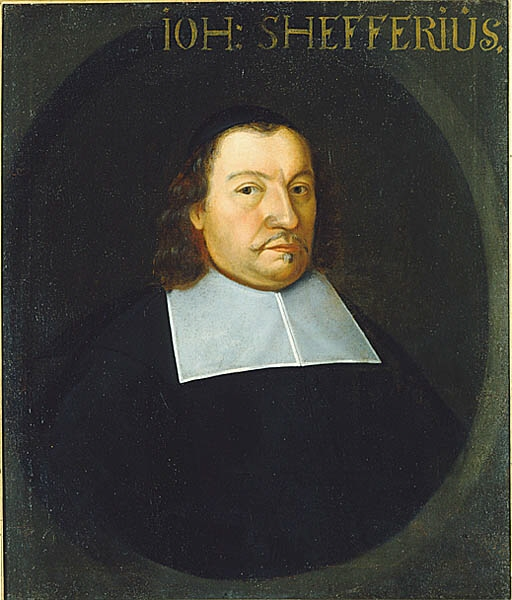
Johannes Schefferus

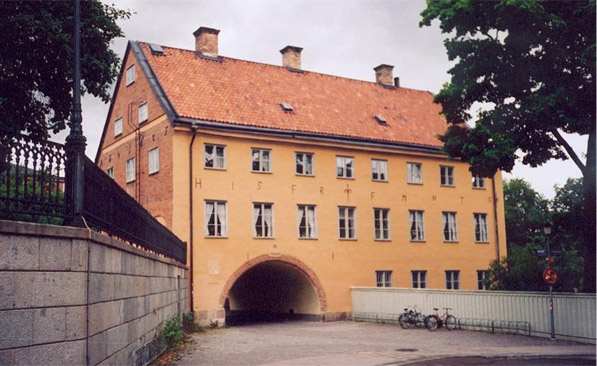
The Skytteanum at Uppsala University

Johannes Schefferus (February 2, 1621 – March 26, 1679) was one of the most important Swedish humanists of his time. He was also known as Angelus and is remembered for writing hymns.

== Biography ==
Schefferus was born in Strasbourg, then part of the Holy Roman Empire. He came from the patrician family (Scheffer), studied at university there and briefly in Leiden, and was in 1648 made professor Skytteanus of eloquence and government at Uppsala University, a chair he held until his death in 1679.

Schefferus also spent time on philological and archaeological studies. His De orbibus tribus aureis became the first publication on Swedish archaeology. The story of the Sami people, Lapponia (1673) became popular around Europe but was not translated into Swedish (as Lappland) until 1956. His posthumous publication, Suecia literata ("The Learned Sweden") (1680) is a Swedish history of science bibliography.

Schefferus was later in life involved in an intellectual dispute, particularly with Olof Verelius (1618–1682) over the location of the Temple at Uppsala. He argued that the temple should be found near the current location of Helga Trefaldighets kyrka (Church of the Holy Trinity) in Uppsala. It is today known that his opponents usually used forgery to meet his argumentation. This was presumably the reason that parts of the largest surviving Gothic text, Codex Argenteus, were retouched.

In 1648, Schefferus married Regina Loccenia, the daughter of a previous (1628–1642) professor skytteanus, Johannes Loccenius, and had two sons (see Scheffer).

== Publications (selected) ==
- German Classics by William Cleaver Wilkinson Published 1900 by Funk & Wagnalls Company in New York, London p. 146
- Upsalia (1666)
- De re vehiculari veterum ("Of the vehicles of the ancients", 1671)
- Svecia literata ("Learned Sweden", 1680)
- Lapponia (1673)
