= List of castles and fortresses in Finland =

This is an incomplete list of castles and fortresses in Finland.

Name	Finnish name	Swedish name	Location	Date	Condition	Picture
St. Olaf's Castle	Olavinlinna	Olofsborg	Savonlinna	1475	Largely restored	
Turku Castle	Turun linna	Åbo slott	Turku	1280	Largely restored	
Häme Castle	Hämeen linna	Tavastehus slott	Hämeenlinna	1320	Largely restored	
Suomenlinna	Suomenlinna	Sveaborg	Helsinki	1748	Largely restored	
Kastelholm Castle	Kastelholman linna	Kastelholms slott	Åland	1388	Partly ruined	
Raseborg Castle	Raaseporin linna	Raseborgs slott	Raseborg	1378	Partly ruined	
Hamina Fortress	Haminan linnoitus	Fredrikshamns fästning	Hamina	1720	Partly ruined	
Kärnäkoski Fortress	Kärnäkosken linnoitus	Kärnäkoski fästning	Savitaipale	1791	Partly ruined	
Bomarsund Fortress	Bomarsundin linnoitus	Bomarsunds fästning	Bomarsund	1832	Ruined	
Svartholm fortress	Svartholman linnoitus	Svartholms fästning	Loviisa	1749	Partly ruined	
Ruotsinsalmi sea fortress	Ruotsinsalmen merilinnoitus	Svensksunds sjöfästning	Kotka	1794	Partly ruined	
Hakoinen Castle	Hakoisten linna	Haga borg	Janakkala	500 BCE	Totally ruined	
Kajaani Castle	Kajaanin linna	Kajana borg	Kajaani	1604	Mostly ruined	
Kuusisto Castle	Kuusiston linna	Kustö biskopsborg	Kaarina	1400	Mostly ruined	
Brahelinna	Brahelinna	Braheslott	Ristiina	1646	Mostly ruined	
Lieto Castle	Liedon linna	Lieto borg	Lieto	1500 BCE	Totally ruined	
Stenberga Castle	Stenberin linna	Stenberga slott	Masku	1200	Totally ruined	
Liinmaa Castle	Liinmaan linna	Vreghdenborg	Eurajoki	14th century	Totally ruined	
Kokemäki Castle	Kokemäen linna	Kumo slott	Kokemäki	1324	Totally ruined	
Oulu Castle	Oulun linna	Uleåborgs slott	Oulu	1375	Totally ruined	
Sibbesborg	Sipoon linna	Sibbesborg	Sipoo	1400	Totally ruined	
Junkarsborg	Junkarsborgin linnoitus	Junkarsborg	Karis	1500	Totally ruined	

== See also ==
- Vyborg Castle
