= Ultuna, Helsinki =

Coordinates: 60°16′N 25°11′E

Ultuna Ultuna
- Helsinki Subdivision
- Position of Ultuna within Helsinki
- Country: Finland
- Region: Uusimaa
- Sub-region: Greater Helsinki
- Municipality: Helsinki
- District: Östersundom
- Subdivision regions: Landbo, Puroniitty
- Population: 1,074
- Subdivision number: 59
- Neighbouring subdivisions: Östersundom, Vantaa, Sipoo

Ultuna is a subdistrict of Helsinki, Finland. It comprises the Porvoo motorway on the north side of the Sipoo to Helsinki. In early 2009, Östersundom connected to the basic circuit. Ultuna is divided into two sections, which are Landbo and Puroniitty.
