= Nikkilä railway station =

Railway station in Sipoo, Finland

Nikkilä Nickby
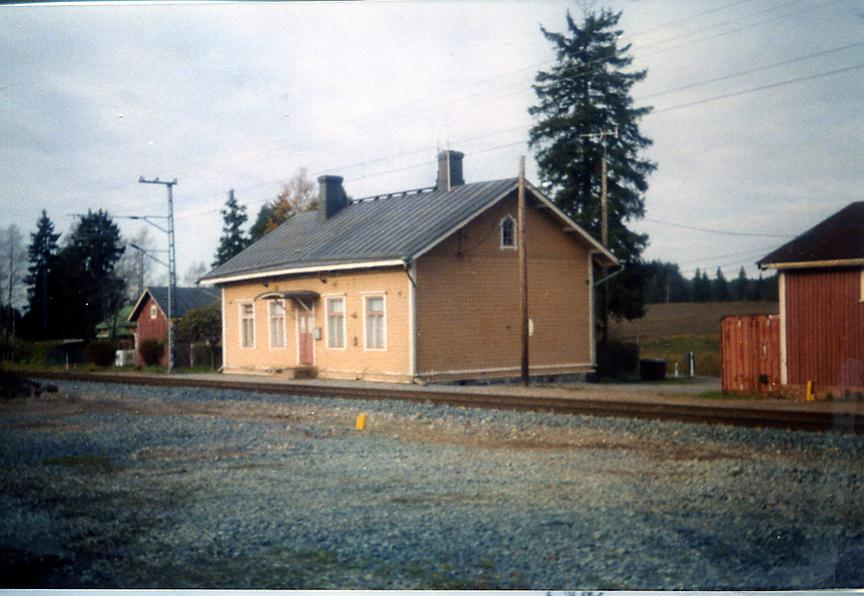

General information
- Location: Asemantie 04130; Nikkilä, Sipoo; Finland
- Coordinates: 60°22′57″N 025°15′58″E
- System: PMR station
- Owner: Finnish Transport Infrastructure Agency
- Operator: Porvoon Museorautatie
- Line: Kerava–Porvoo railway
- Platforms: 1 side platform
- Tracks: 1

Other information
- Station code: Nlä
- Classification: Halt

History
- Opened: 16 June 1874
Location

The Nikkilä railway station (Finnish: Nikkilän rautatieasema, Swedish: Nickby järnvägsstation) is located in the village and urban area of Nikkilä, in the municipality of Sipoo, Finland.

== History ==
Nikkilä is one of the original stations of the private Kerava–Porvoo railway, opened in July 1874. It was established close to the Nikkilä manor, and due to its influence, a village started to form between the station and the road leading to the Sipoo church. In time, the station village and the Sipoo parish village fused together to form a single densely populated area. Upon the foundation of the Nikkilä psychiatric hospital in 1914, a narrow gauge railway was constructed to connect it to the broad gauge station in the village. The private railway was nationalised in 1917.

The Finnish State Railways ceased operating passenger trains on the Porvoo line in 1981, and freight services were discontinued in June 1990. This jeopardized the future of the line, but it ended up being preserved as a heritage railway. The railyard at Nikkilä was dismantled in 1997, and later in 2007, the station building, its warehouse and several other relevant buildings were transferred under the ownership of Senate Properties.

In December 2018, as part of a pilot initiative by the Finnish Transport Infrastructure Agency, a new platform built entirely out of timber was constructed in Nikkilä. The platform is 45 metres (148 ft) long and 40 centimetres (16 in) high. The latter is contrary to both the current standard height of 55 centimetres (22 in) and the old one of 26.5 centimetres (10.4 in), fitting lower floor rolling stock such as tram-trains as well as the Dm7 railbuses most commonly operated in the museum traffic between Kerava and Porvoo. The FTIA has expressed willingness to build more wooden platforms elsewhere in Finland, should the Nikkilä trial be successful.

== Future ==
The restarting of regular passenger transport by rail to and from Nikkilä as part of the Helsinki commuter rail network has been brought up and investigated on numerous occasions. The Helsinki region MAL 2019 plan (Finnish: Maankäyttö, asuminen ja liikenne; "land use, living and transport") states that extending services back into Nikkilä is possible by 2030, should the areas of the municipalities of Kerava and Sipoo develop as expected. In addition to Nikkilä, the old halts of Ahjo in Kerava and Talma in Sipoo would be reopened for use.
