= Paippinen =

Village in Sipoo, Finland

Coordinates: 60°27.2′N 25°14.5′E

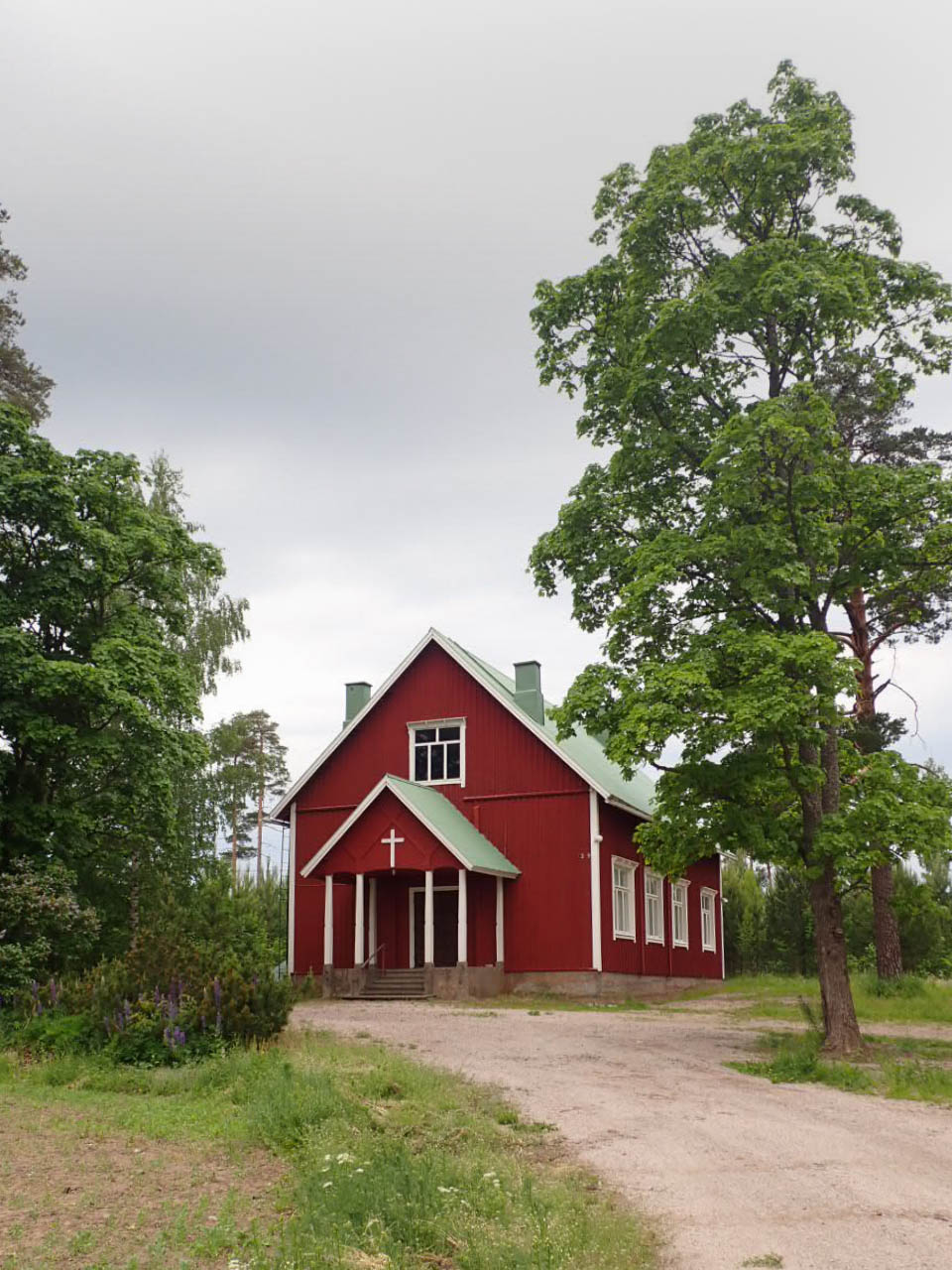
Paippinen Village Church

Paippinen (Swedish: Paipis) is a village in the northern part of the Sipoo municipality in Uusimaa, Finland, about 12 kilometres (7.5 mi) north of the municipal centre Nikkilä. The village consists mainly of forest, with fields and meadows in the south. In the early 2020s, the village had a population of over 1,500.

The village was once home to Sipoo's only workers' house—built in 1906—which was possibly burned down during the Civil War of 1918.

One of the village's most renowned landmarks today is the wooden summer church located in the northern part of the village. The village is also home to Finland Eswarar Temple, the first Hindu temple of Finland dedicated to Shiva.
