= Ior Bock =

Finnish tour guide and mythologist (1942–2010)

- Bock at his home in Munkkiniemi, Helsinki
- Born: 17 January 1942; Porvoo, Finland
- Died: 23 October 2010 (aged 68); Helsinki, Finland
- Other name: Bror Holger Svedlin
- Occupations: Lighting technician, actor, tour guide
- Known for: The Bock Saga
- Parent(s): Knut Victor Boxström (1860–1942) and Rhea Boxström (1899–1984) (According to Ior Bock)

Ior Bock (Swedish: [ˈiːɔr ˈbɔkː]; originally Bror Holger Svedlin; 17 January 1942 – 23 October 2010) was a Swedish-speaking Finnish tour guide, actor, and mythologist. Bock was a colourful media personality and became a very popular tour guide at the island fortress of Suomenlinna, where he worked from 1973 to 1998.

In 1984, Bock raised public interest and discussion when he asserted his family line (Boxström) were keepers of an ancient folklore tradition that provides insight into the pagan culture of Finland, including old fertility rites. These origin stories are known as the Bock saga. His philosophical and mythological theories gained a large international following.

== Biography ==
=== Birth ===
According to Bock's autobiographical The Bock Saga, he was born as the result of an incestuous relationship between sea-captain Knut Victor Boxström (1860–1942), who would have been 81 years old at the time, and his daughter Rhea, 42. Knut's only son had been killed in the Finnish Civil War in 1918, and this was a desperate measure to continue the male line and bring the extensive family-saga about heathen times to the public eye. Knut Victor Boxström died shortly after Ior's baptism, one month after his birth. Consequently, he was adopted by Rhea's husband, Bror Gustaf Bertil Svedlin.

In 2004, the freelance journalist Magnus Londen published an article where he claimed that Ior Bock was actually an adopted son of Rhea Boxström-Svedlin and Bror Svedlin. According to Londen, official adoption documents in the National Archive in Helsinki prove that Ior's biological mother was a 23-year-old gardening instructor in Porvoo. His father was said to be a Spanish sailor. After Bock's death, a family friend from Sipoo, quoting her mother, supported the adoption claims. In 2003, Bock had answered Londen's queries by explaining that the adoption-theme was a necessary precaution from his mother to hide the incestuous act that led to his birth.

=== Adolescence ===
According to Magnus Londen's article, young Holger Svedlin was sent off to an orphanage for one year at age nine. Londen, citing unnamed acquaintances of the Svedlin family, states that Holger (who had adopted the name Ior, meaning Eeyore in Swedish) had displayed irrational behaviour and that his mother had been unable to cope with him since his adopted father had died the previous year. It was during this period that, according to the stories he later told, his twenty years of daily training into the sound system and secret saga of his family began. It was his biological mother as well as his aunt/sister Rachel who taught him for two hours every day, and only when they were away was he in the orphanage.

At the age of 15, he went into training practice as a lighting technician at Svenska Teatern (the Swedish Theatre) in Helsinki. Here he completed his basic education to become a professional actor at age 21.

==== Shooting death of his brother ====
In 1962 Ior Svedlin's adopted brother, Erik Svedlin, died by a gunshot at the age of 23. Due to his participation in the situation that led to the death, Ior received a probation of four months, on the grounds of "participation in acts that led to involuntary manslaughter". After his parents' death, Ior Bock (as he was known by then) stated that Erik Svedlin actually committed suicide due to a family drama – as his planned marriage was disapproved of by his family. Erik's fiancé as well as friends have disputed this claim in interviews with Londen. According to Ior Bock's version, to avoid a social scandal, the incident was termed an "accidental death" and explained to be a result of the two brothers "playing around". According to Magnus Londen, the investigation report in the police archive in Helsinki states that the brothers had been listening to music while Ior was dancing and playing with a gun. Ior told the police that the gun went off accidentally when he threw it to his brother. Everyone involved considered the incident to be an accident.

=== Professional life and publicity ===
According to Magnus Londen, the stories told by Ior Svedlin during his guided tours gradually evolved in a bizarre direction, resulting in a conflict with his employer. From 1984 to 1998 he continued his studies of Sveaborg while guiding on a free-lance basis, using his new name Ior Bock.

Starting in the mid-1970s, Bockström-Svedlin started regularly visiting the well-known hippie paradise Goa on the Arabian Sea coast of India. Every year from October to April he stayed in the small village Chapora, developing a significant crowd of supporters, or apprentices as some back in Finland would call them. According to Londen, Ior Svedlin was interviewed by the Finnish newspaper Hufvudstadsbladet in 1982 and he was quoted there giving a statement that Londen has found most poignant in yielding a critical perspective on Ior Bock's own biography, which he began to present to the public two years thereafter.

People have attempted to understand why the Indian philosophy has reached highest in the world, despite the people having neither reading nor writing skills. But it has been built up through an oral tradition. The eldest was taught by his father, and it was his duty to again teach his siblings.

— Ior Svedlin (Bock) to Hufvudstadsbladet 4 May 1982

==== Excavation of the Temple of Lemminkäinen ====
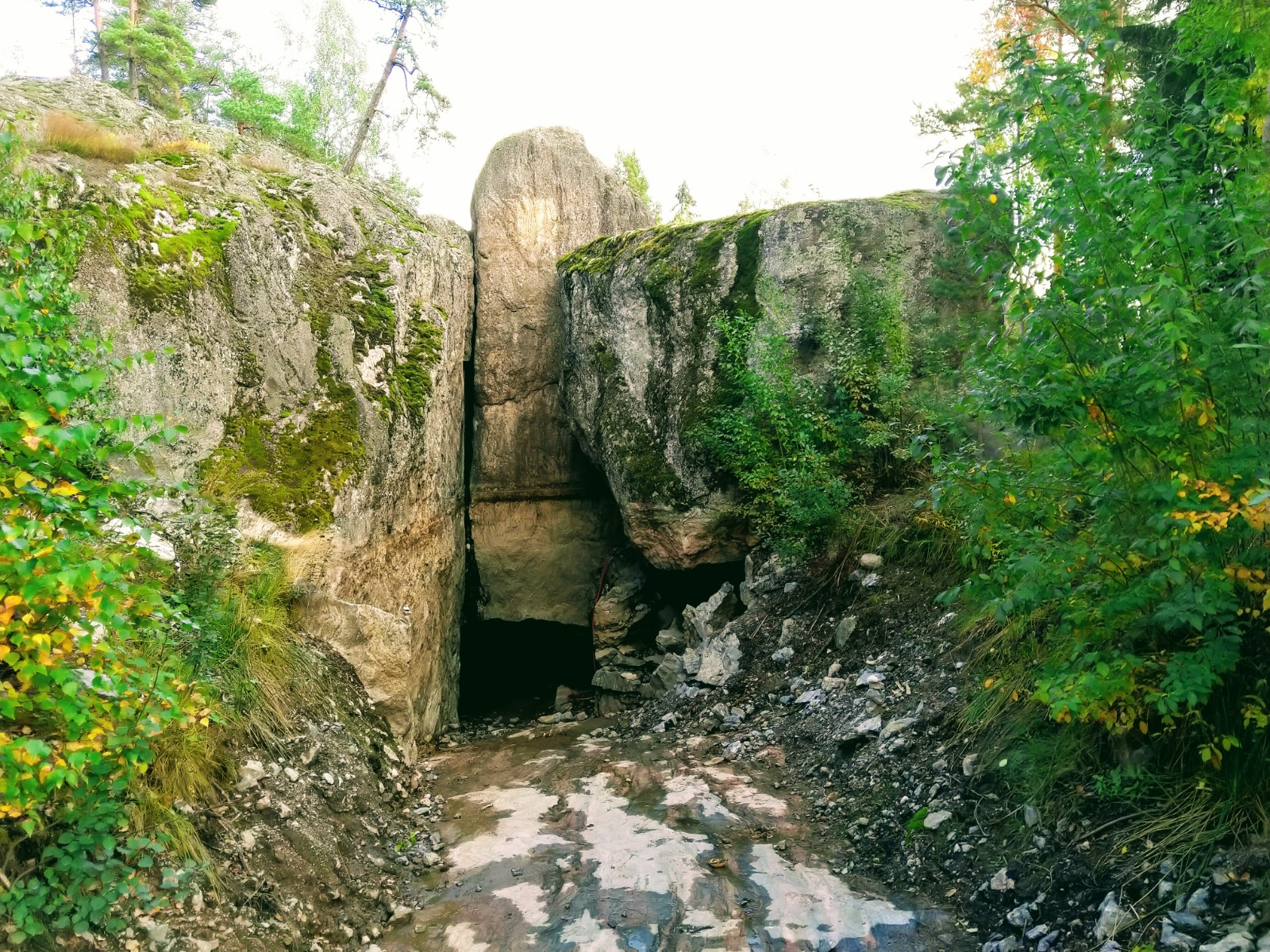
Entrance of Lemminkäinen's Temple

In 1987, Ior Bock and his supporters began fund-raising in order to finance excavation of a sediment-filled cave that is situated under the hill 'Sibbosberg', situated north of Gumbostrand in Sipoo, 30 km east of Helsinki – at the estate Bock had inherited from his parents. The cave was supposed to lead to a furnished temple-chamber inside the Sibbosberg, known as the Temple of Lemminkäinen. Inside of the temple chamber, a spiraling hallway is described, with small hall-rooms that were created to hold the collected treasures from each generation of the heathen culture of ancient Finland. The time of ongoing storage is counted in millennia, accumulating a large treasure chamber. The last storage was done in 987 when the entrance hall was filled and the entrance door closed and hidden, as foreign warlords would enter the Baltic area and - by the year 1050 - reached and conquered the major settlements of southern Finland.

Due to the controversial statements of the family-saga, The National Board of Antiquities in Finland retracted from involving themselves with the project. The participation of professional archaeologists was restricted to limited official visits, during which nothing archaeologically significant was observed. In one archaeological survey, the Gumbo cave was defined as a natural formation of geological interest. According to the surveying archaeologist, the only man-made feature there was a recent rock carving.

In 1990, police arrested Bock and 33 other participants in the dig on suspicion of the use and distribution of Indian hemp. When the court sentenced three of Bock's foreign companions the results were a public scandal and the withdrawal of the sponsor of the excavation, the major construction company Lemminkäinen Group. Since then, smaller digs have been made. In 1999, a stabbing left Bock quadriplegic. When Bock was still in hospital, his debts to the Lemminkäinen Group and a geotechnical contractor (from 1992) were used to instigate a process against him for debts and credits. During Bock's stay in Goa the following winter, his assets were confiscated and his properties sold.

==== Hoard of the Kajaani Castle ====
Another location of Bock's stories was Kajaani Castle, an early 17th-century stone fortress. According to Bock, a castle was present there already in the 13th century, when a royal treasure of kings of Finland, including a golden buck statue, was hidden in a well in the courtyard of the castle. Some excitement arose when ground-penetrating radar investigations made in 1996 and 2000 suggested that a sizable metal item was located at 4 meters depth of the courtyard of the fort. According to the state archaeologist Henrik Lilius the item was probably an old cannon that could have fallen into the well during the destruction of the fort in 1716. A new investigation made in 2006 was not able to verify the earlier observations. During an archaeological excavation made later in 2006, it was noticed that an electric ground cable had been dug in the courtyard at 40 cm depth. According to the project manager Selja Flink of the National Board of Antiquities, it was most probably the object noticed in the ground-penetrating radar investigations. According to Flink, there is no archaeological or documentary evidence of the well mentioned by Bock.

=== Death ===
On 23 October 2010, Bock was stabbed to death in his apartment in Munkkiniemi, Helsinki. Police arrested two men, Indian nationals aged 19 and 28, who had shared his apartment and had worked as his personal assistants.

The younger suspect was subsequently set free and cleared of all charges. The 28-year-old was found not culpable by reason of insanity and in 2011 he was deported to India.

== See also ==
- Temple of Lemminkäinen
