= Puroniitty =

Puroniitty Bäckängen
- Helsinki Subdivision
- Position of Puroniitty within Helsinki
- Coordinates: 60°17′01″N 25°14′20″E
- Country: Finland
- Region: Uusimaa
- Sub-region: Greater Helsinki
- Municipality: Helsinki
- District: Östersundom
- Population: 220
- Subdivision number: 592
- Neighbouring subdivisions: Östersundom, Landbo, Sipoo

Puroniitty (Finnish), Bäckängen (Swedish) is a neighborhood of Helsinki, Finland.

It is the easternmost and northernmost part of Helsinki and belongs to the Östersundom district. Prior to 2009, Puroniitty belonged to Sipoo. At the turn of the year 2008/2009, 220 people lived in Puroniity
