= Landbo =

Coordinates: 60.27°N 25.1983°E

Landbo Landbo
- Helsinki Subdivision
- Position of Landbo within Helsinki
- Country: Finland
- Region: Uusimaa
- Sub-region: Greater Helsinki
- Municipality: Helsinki
- District: Östersundom
- Population: 854
- Postal codes: 00890
- Subdivision number: 591
- Neighbouring subdivisions: Östersundom, Puroniitty, Vantaa, Sipoo

Landbo is a neighborhood of Helsinki, Finland.
