= Sipoonkorpi National Park =

National park in Finland

- IUCN category II (national park)
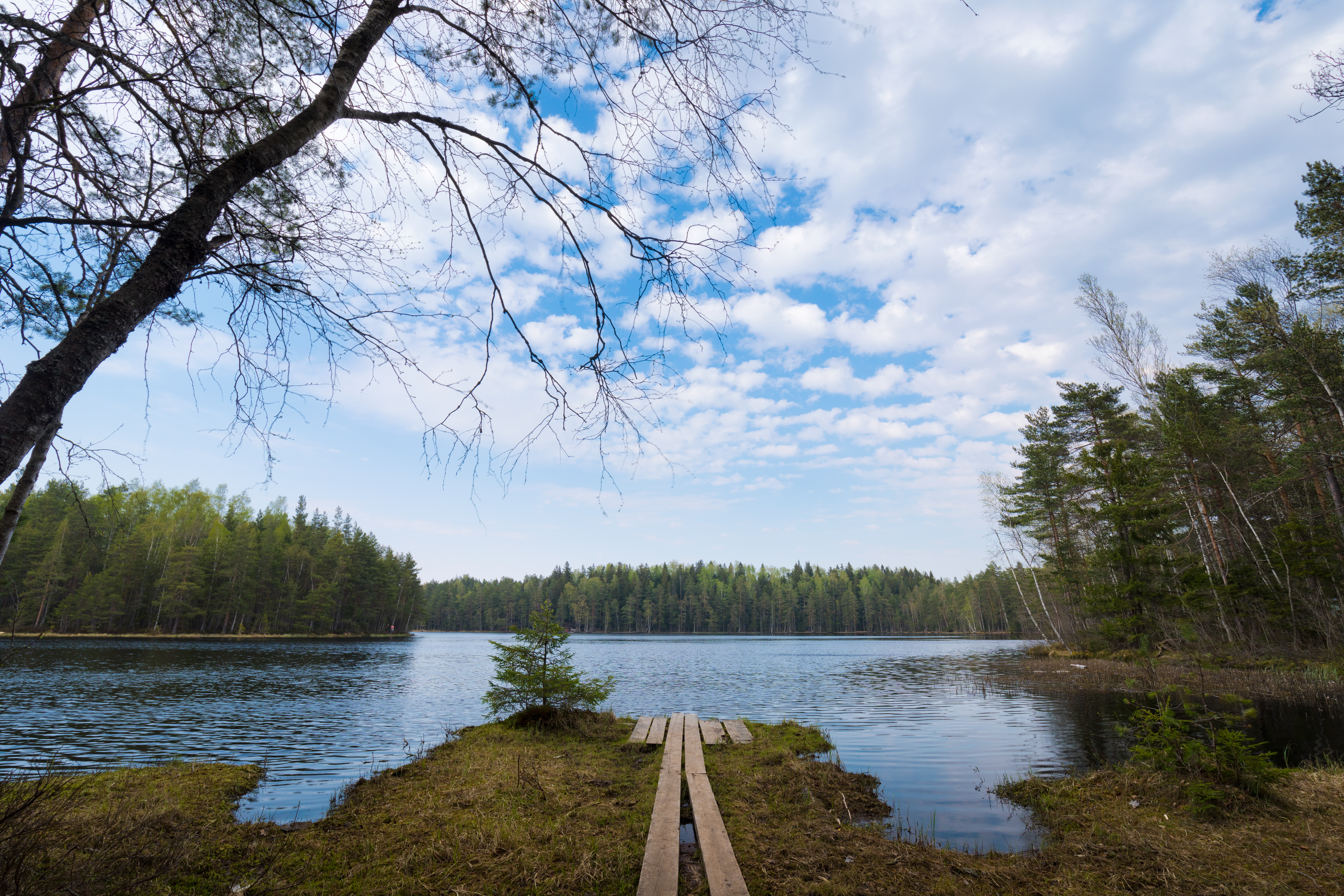

- Location within Finland
- Location: Uusimaa, Finland
- Coordinates: 60°18′54″N 25°13′8″E
- Area: 18.57 km^{2} (7.17 sq mi)
- Established: 2011
- Visitors: 165,500 (in 2024)
- Governing body: Metsähallitus
- Website: https://www.luontoon.fi/en/destinations/sipoonkorpi-national-park

Sipoonkorpi National Park (Finnish: Sipoonkorven kansallispuisto, Swedish: Sibbo storskogs nationalpark) is a national park in Finland. It was established on March 2, 2011. It is located in the municipalities of Helsinki, Vantaa and Sipoo.

The area is mostly covered by spruce forest, swamps and cultural landscape. The small Byabäcken river, home to a rich bird population, flows through Sipoonkorpi.
