= Brahelinna =

Count per Brahe's ruined castle

- Ristiina, Mikkeli, South Savo, Finland
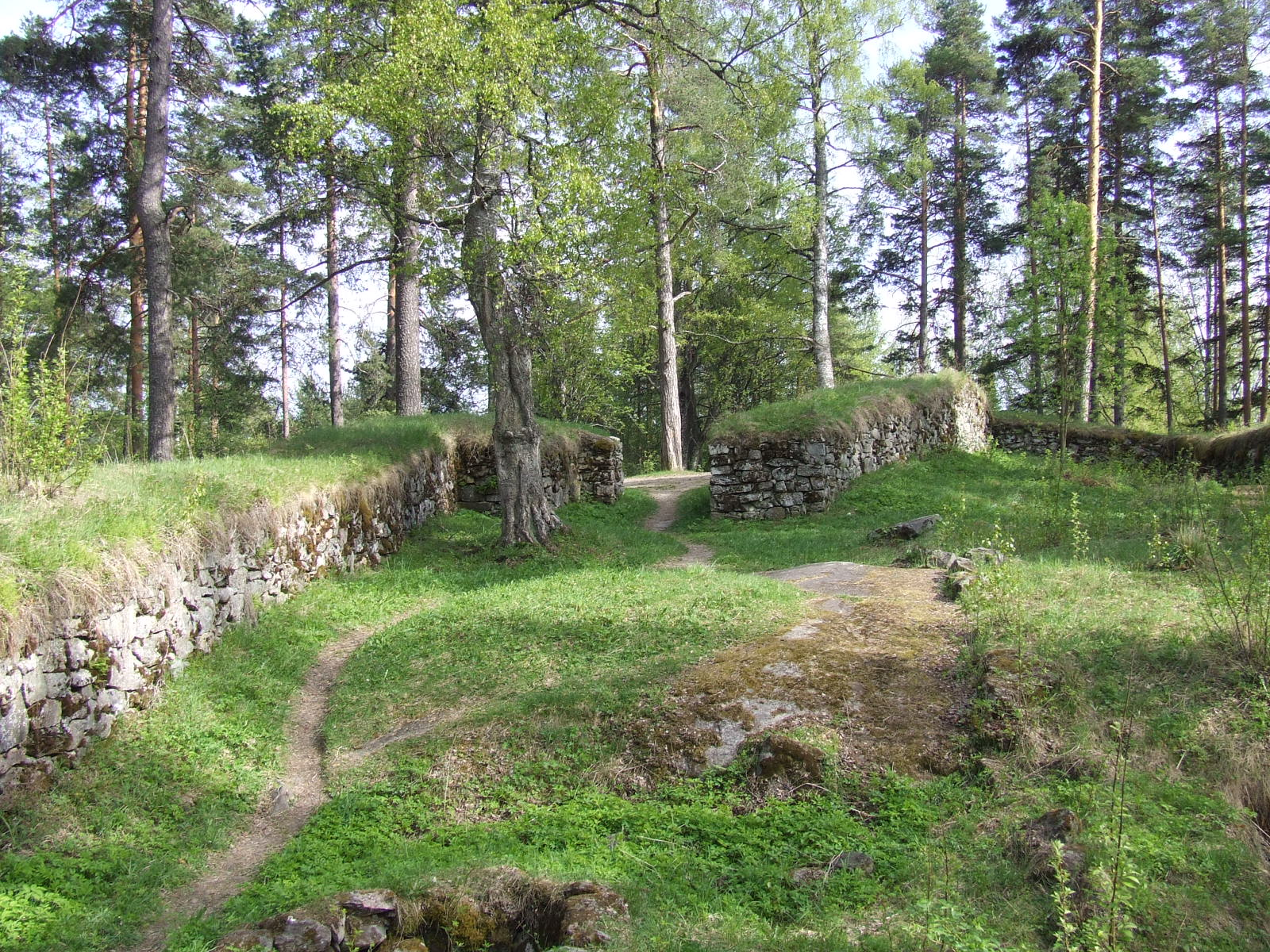

Site information
- Type: Castle

Location
- Coordinates: 61.49718°N 27.27219°E

Brahelinna (Swedish: Braheslott; also known as the Brahe Castle) is a castle ruin in Ristiina, located in the southern part of Mikkeli in South Savo, Finland. It was founded by Count Per Brahe the Younger.

== See also ==
- List of castles in Finland
  - Kajaani Castle
  - Oulu Castle
