= Björkudden =

Coordinates: 60°15′20″N 25°12′30″E

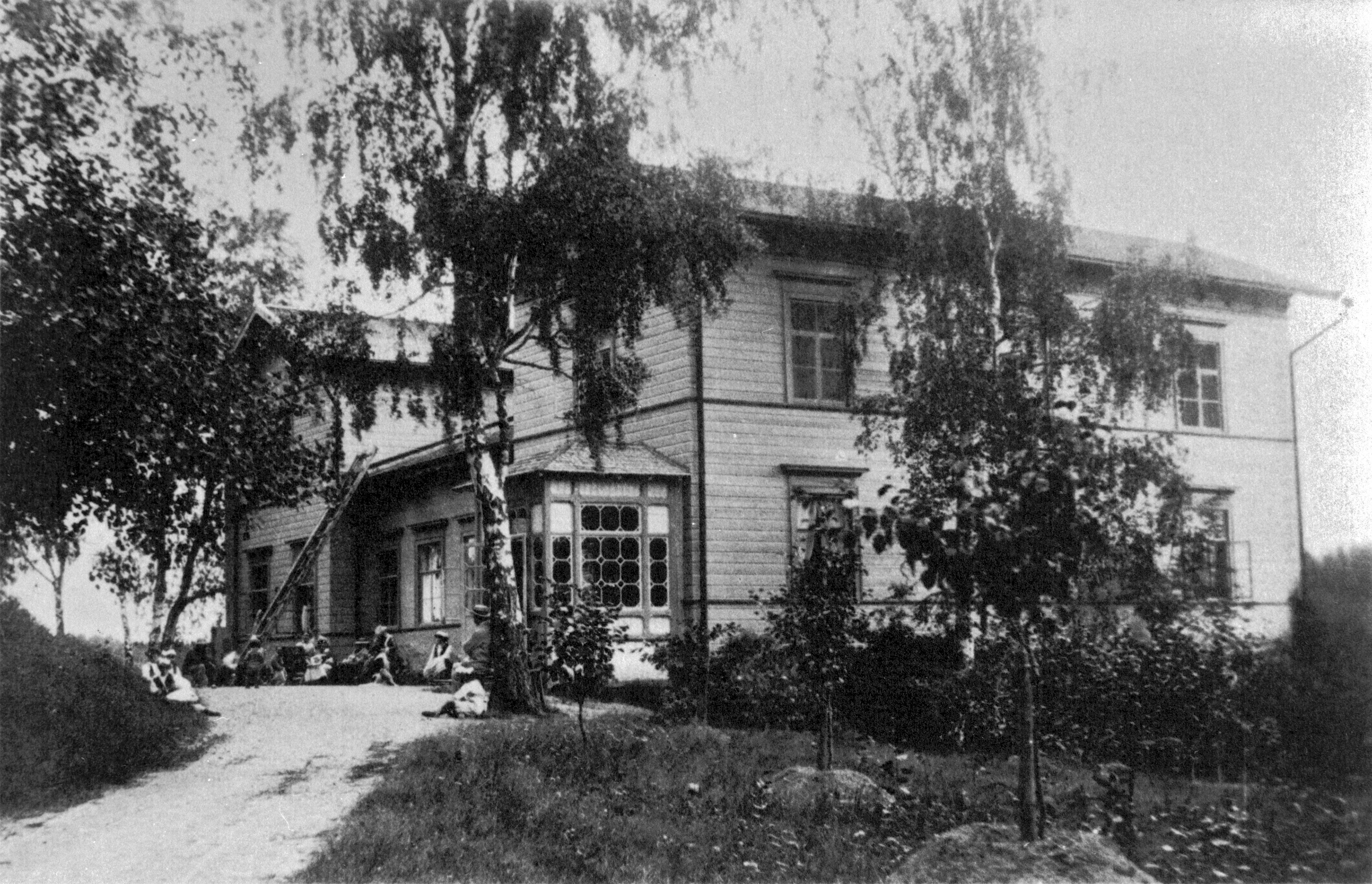
Koivuniemi in 1879

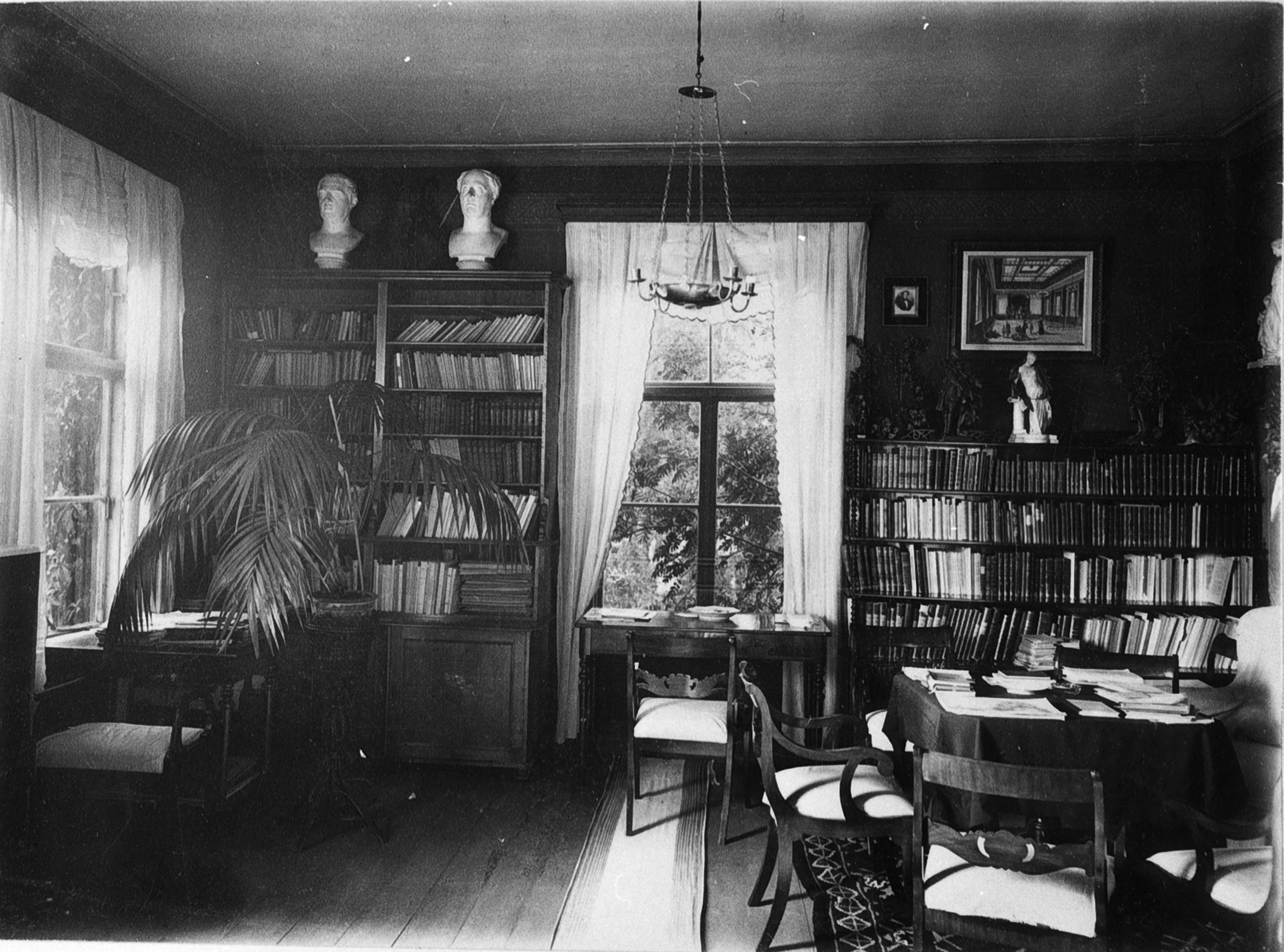
The library at Koivuniemi

Björkudden (Finnish: Koivuniemi) is a manor house in Östersundom, Helsinki, Finland, designed by the architect Wilhelm Linsén and built in the mid-19th century. Koivuniemi was the home of the Finnish writer and historian Zacharias Topelius. After his death it returned to the previous owners and is to the present owned by the Lilius family.

Well known guests of Koivuniemi include the poet Carl Snoilsky, writer Karl August Tavaststjerna and the social activist Alexandra Gripenberg.

== Sources ==
- https://web.archive.org/web/20070224013520/http://www.nykarlebyvyer.nu/SIDOR/TEXTER/PROSA/NF/topelinf.htm
- https://web.archive.org/web/20090912100820/http://sivut.sipooinstituutti.net/kotiseutu/vasen.htm
- https://web.archive.org/web/20080926133100/http://www.sls.fi/topelius/biografi.htm
- http://www.histdoc.net/varia/mechelin1888sv.html
- http://www.kansallisbiografia.fi/english/person/4437
- https://web.archive.org/web/20080926133100/http://www.sls.fi/topelius/biografi.htm
