= Stéphane Rosse =

French cartoonist (1962–2024)

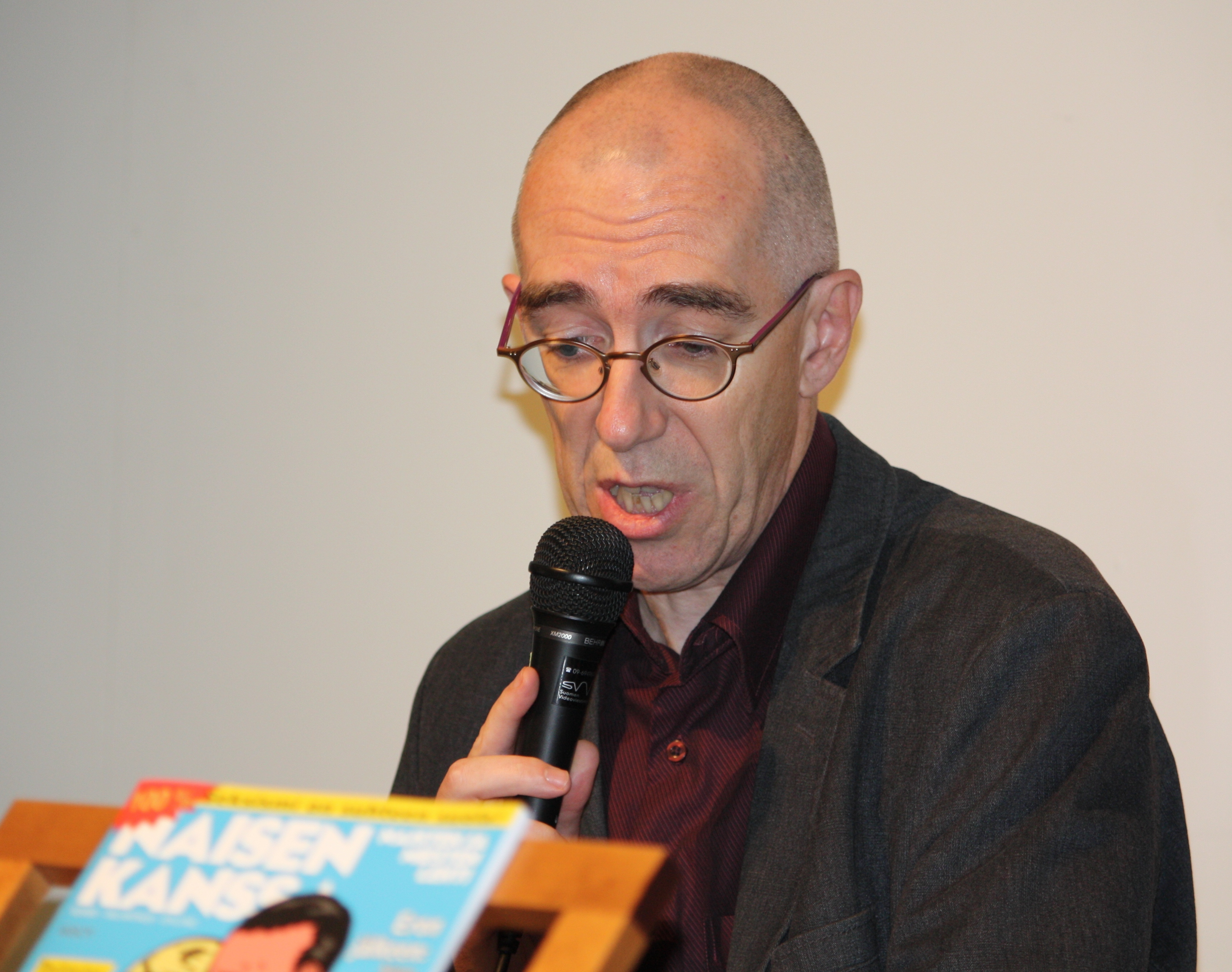
- Rosse in 2010
- Born: 6 October 1962; Dreux, France
- Died: 5 March 2024 (aged 61); Sipoo, Finland
- Occupation: Comic artist

Stéphane Rosse (6 October 1962 – 5 March 2024) was a French comic writer and artist.

== Biography ==
Born in Dreux on 6 October 1962, Rosse was a regular contributor to Métal hurlant in the 1980s, where his works were received with mixed reviews. He was close with Charlie Schlingo and Professeur Choron. He moved to Finland in 1993 and became an illustrator. He drew for texts by Teppo Sillantaus and Mikael Gylling for the comedy series Naisen Kanssa in the magazine Nyt, owned by Helsingin Sanomat.

Stéphane Rosse died at his home in Sipoo on 5 March 2024, at the age of 61.

== Publications ==
=== In French ===
- N comme cornichon (1989)
- Onulf, le cybernéticien, Grosse Bittre et Cracra-Cracra (2001)
- La Femme : Leçons de choses (2008)

=== In Finnish ===
- Naisen kanssa (1998)
- Työkirja (2001)
- Ymmällään naisen kanssa (2002)
- Opas miehen ja naisen väliseen ylioppilaselämään (2005)
- Nykyaikainen parisuhde värikuvina (2008)
- Greatest Hits (2009)
