= Vainudden Standing Stone =

Vainudden Standing Stone, Vainudden 2
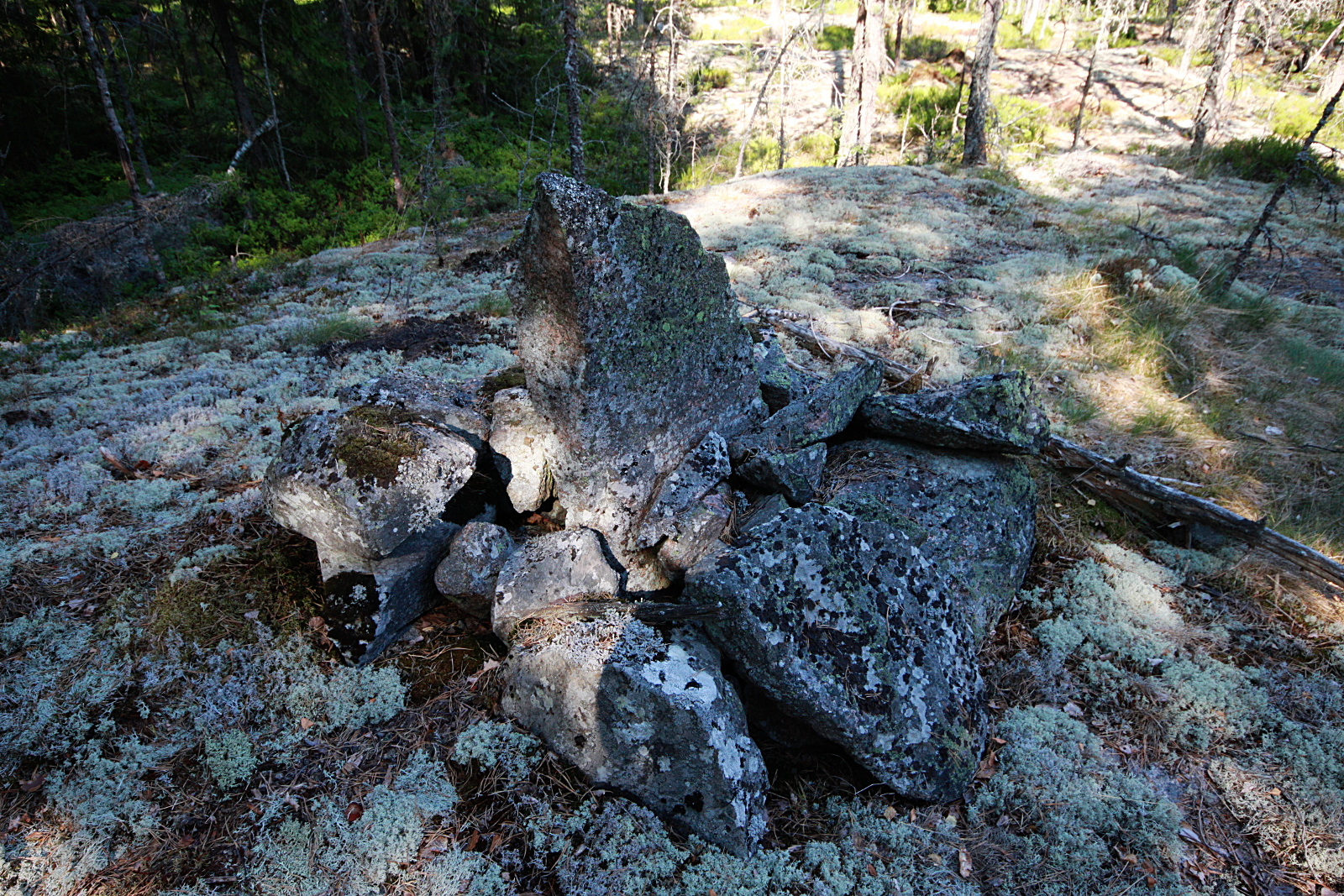
- View of the site of the Vainudden Standing Stone
- Interactive map of Vainudden Standing Stone, Vainudden 2
- 60°16.716′N 25°18.389′E
- Type: Monument
- Location: Sipoo, Finland

History
- Built: Nordic Bronze Age

Site notes
- Material: granite
- Height: 50 cm (20 in)
- Public access: Jokamiehenoikeus, Freedom to roam

Located on the Vainudden peninsula - part of Hitå - in southern Sipoo is a small standing stone and evidence of Nordic Bronze Age activity c. 1700–500 BC

== Standing stone ==
The stones are of rectangular cross-section approximately 50 cm x 50 cm arranged in a square with single upright stone of same cross-section standing 1m high. The stone is now a marker of the border between properties in the area.

== Bronze-age activities ==
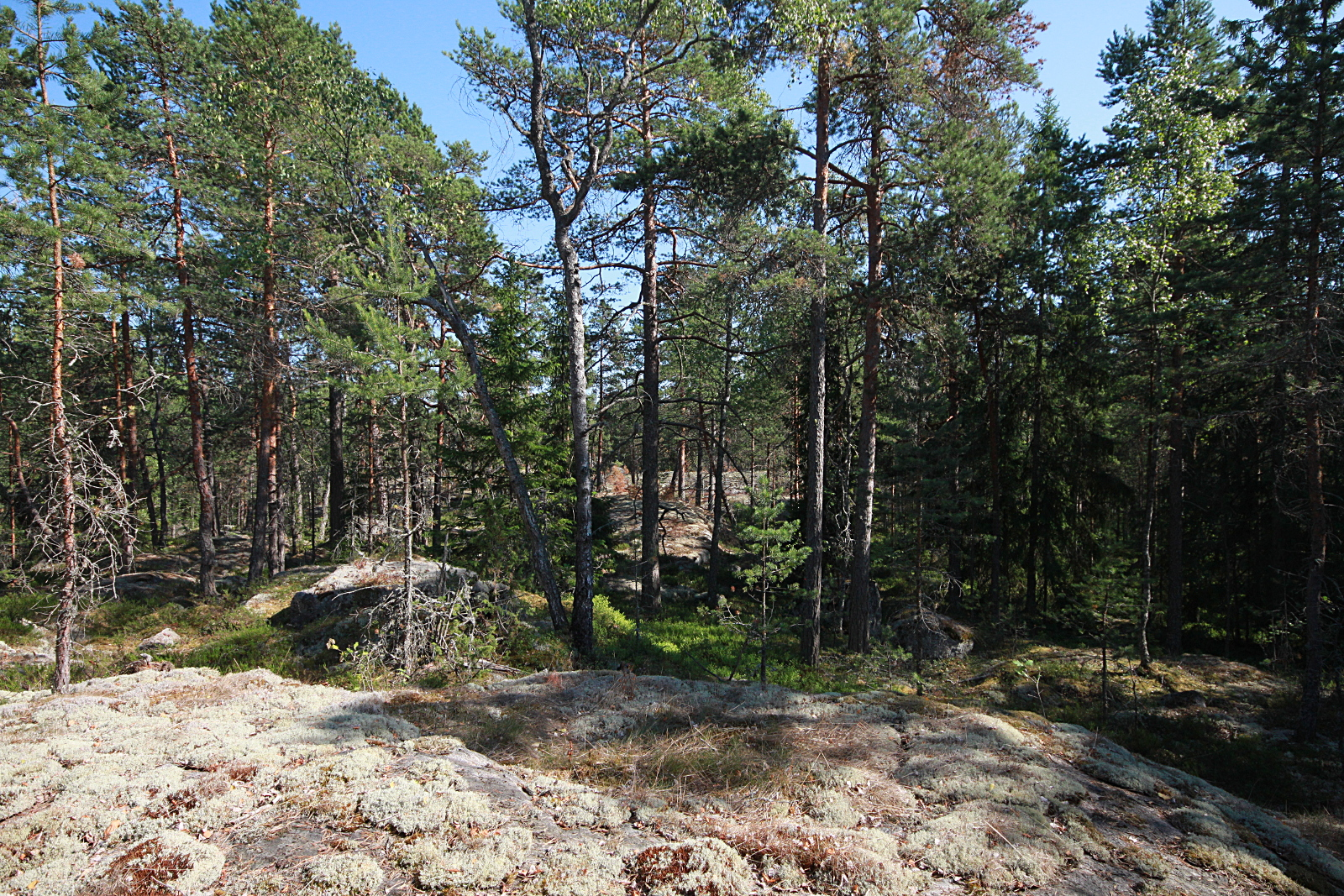
View of the site of Bronze Age workings on Vainudden

To the immediate south of the stone is an area thought to have been used for carving stones and possibly camping; two rocks show possible workings by hand. There is circumstantial evidence of a moat. The rocks are covered in moss and lichen making identification of the area difficult.
