= Aborch =

Castle in Finland

Aborch was a Medieval castle in Finland. It existed in the late 14th century by the river Kokemäenjoki. The site of the castle is not known and there are only few sources referring to the castle.

== History ==
Aborch was founded after demolition of the Kokemäki Castle. Aborch is mentioned in 1395 as a part of lands in Satakunta. Aborch was built to protect trade in Kokemäenjoki area and scholars suggest that it has been located on an island in the river. Islands of Isoluoto and Linnaluoto are among the suggested locations. The castle was left without use in the early 15th century.
