= Sibbesborg =

Medieval castle in Sipoo, Uusimaa, Finland

Coordinates: 60°17′32″N 25°19′10″E

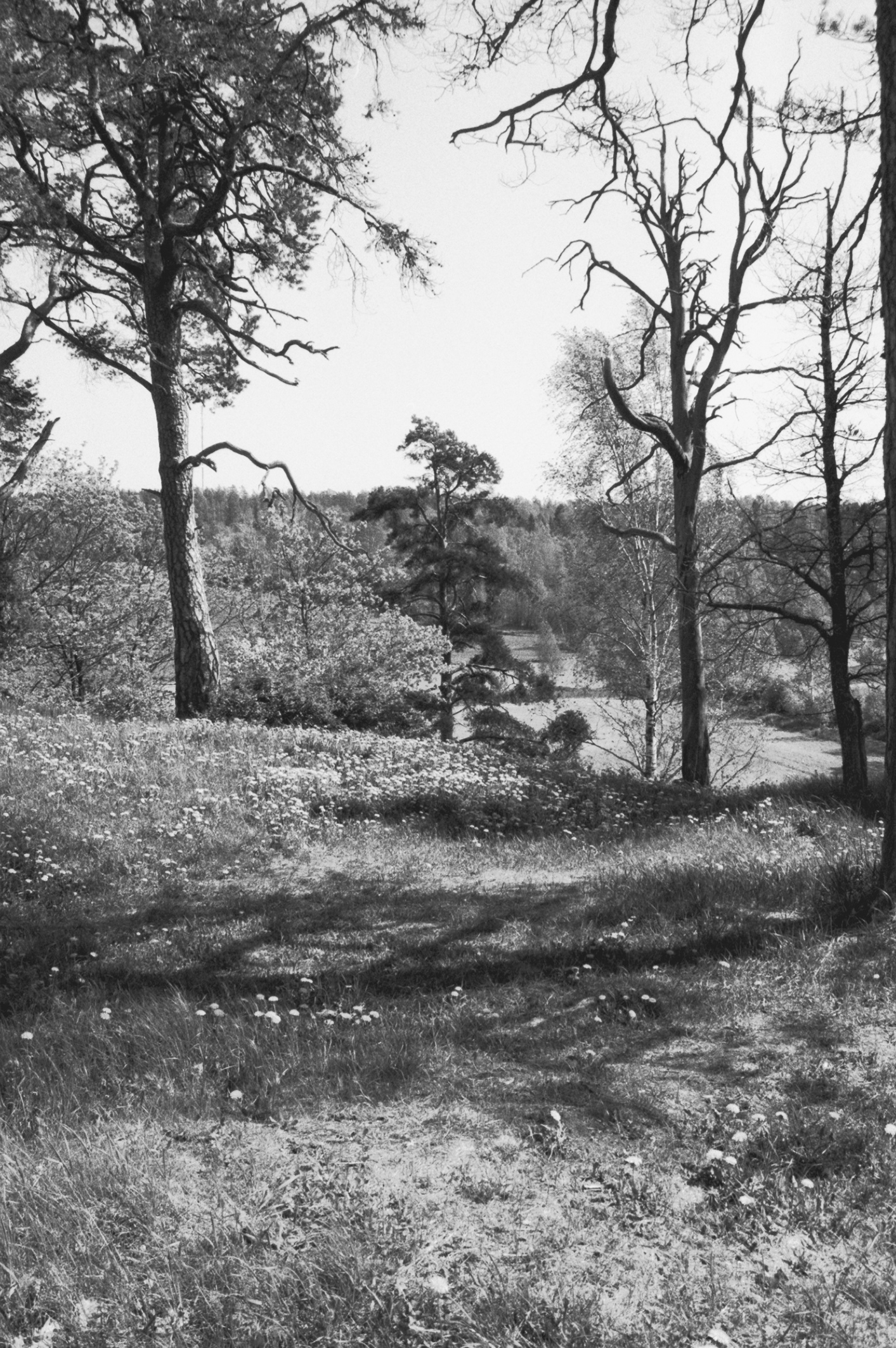
View east from Sibbesborg hillfort

Sibbesborg was a medieval castle in Sipoo, Finland. Today, only some earth walls remain on the forested hill upon which it stood. The castle was mostly made of bricks and wood in the late 14th century.

Sibbesborg was originally located on an island, but due to the post-glacial rebound the hill has been firmly connected to the mainland since the 17th century. The site can be accessed on foot.

== See also ==
- Temple of Lemminkäinen
