= Nikkilä =

Administrative centre of Sipoo, Finland

Coordinates: 60°22′36″N 25°16′06″E

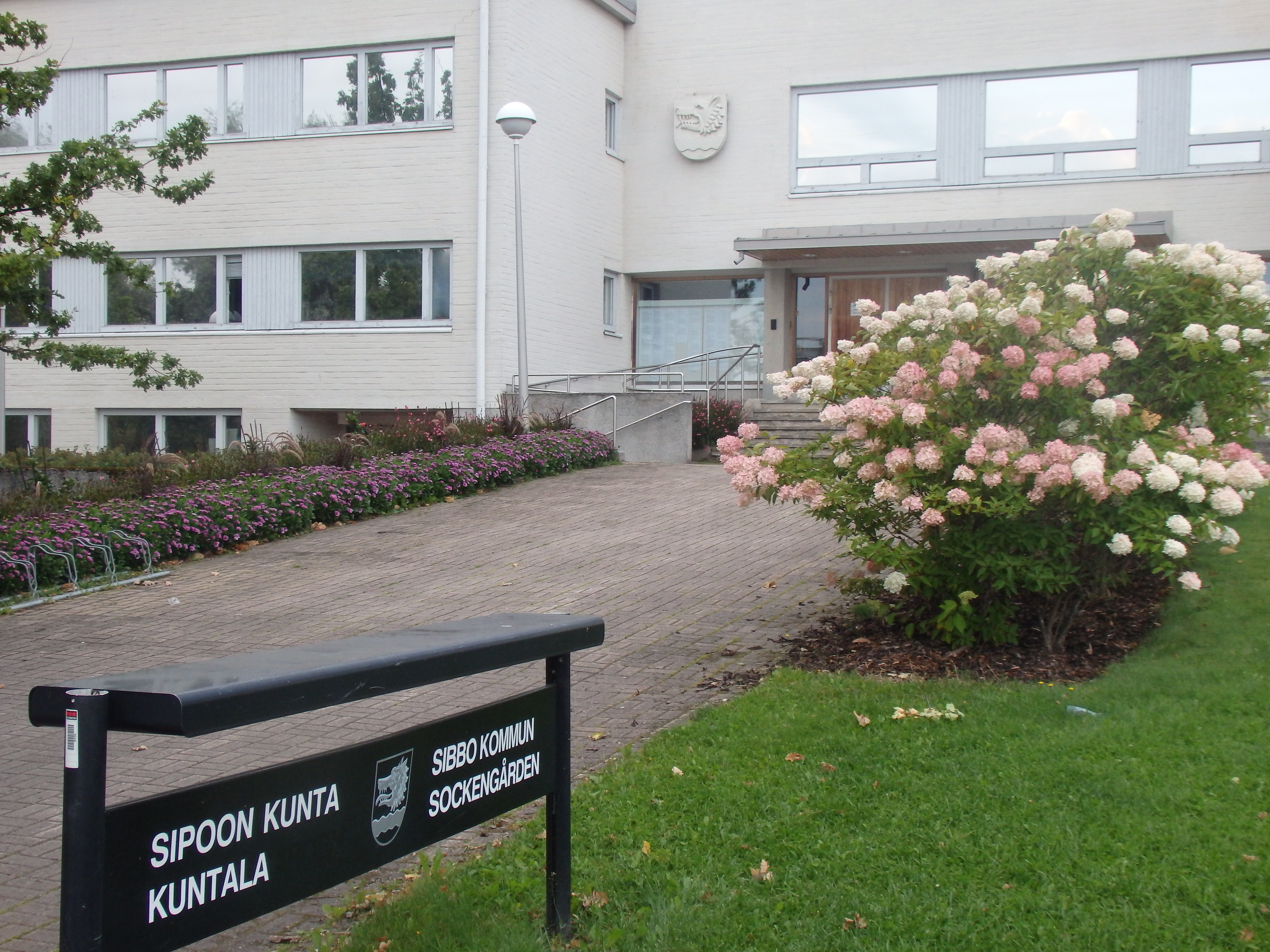
Sipoo Town Hall in Nikkilä.

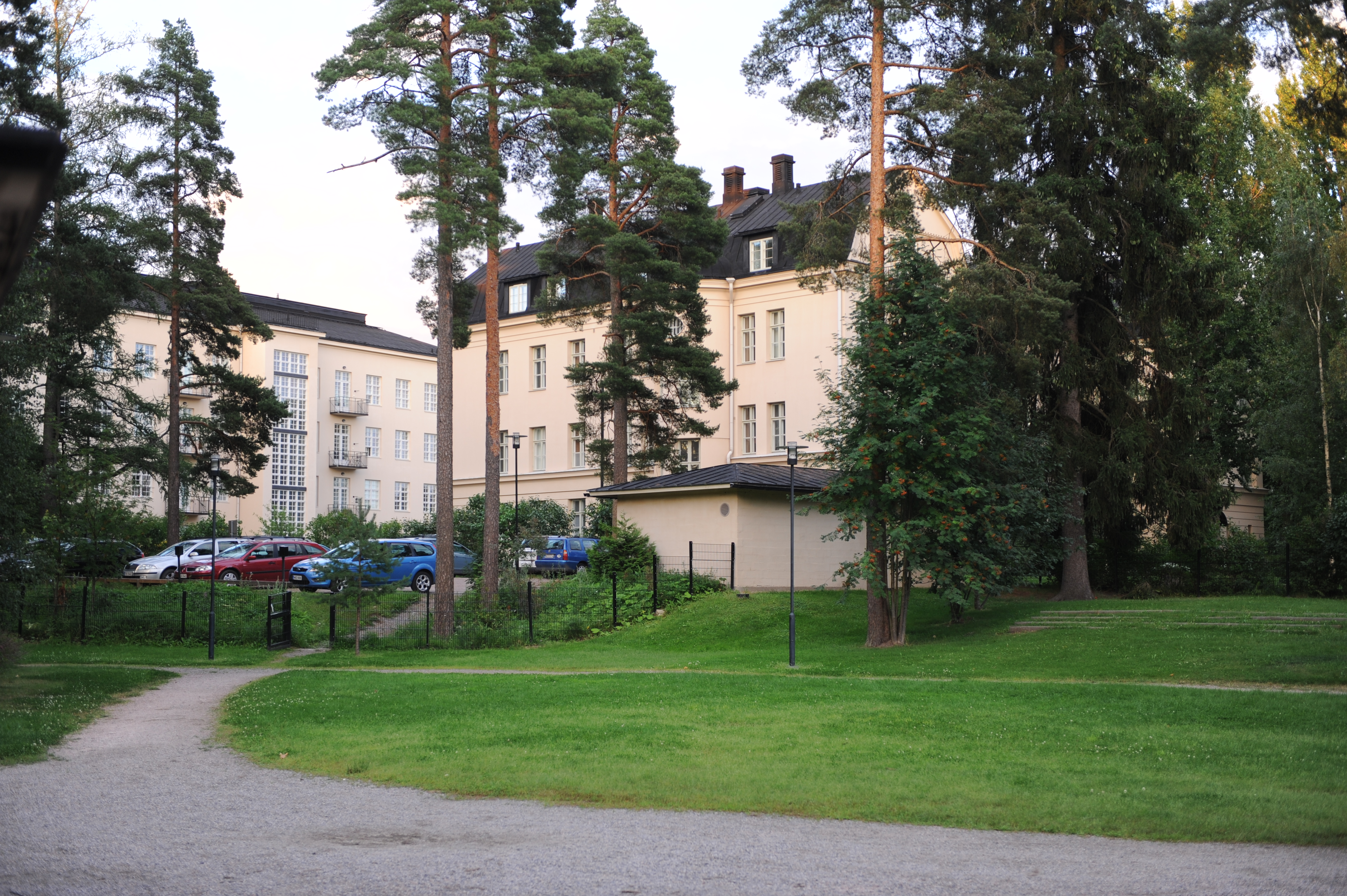
A hospital in Nikkilä.

Nikkilä (Finnish: [ˈnikːilæ]; Swedish: Nickby [ˈnikːbyː]) is a village located in the Sipoo municipality in the Uusimaa region of the Southern Finland province. Nikkilä is the largest village and the administrative centre of Sipoo.

From 1914 until 1999 there was a psychiatric hospital in Nikkilä/Nickby, built by the city of Helsinki. The hospital's name was The Psychiatric hospital of Helsinki, Nikkilä.(Finnish: Nikkilän mielisairaala, Swedish: Helsingfors Sjukhus Nickby).

There are two churches in Nikkilä/Nickby. The older one was built in the 15th century, the new one in 1885.

The Nikkilä railway station is located along the Kerava–Porvoo railway. As of 1991, the line has been operated as a heritage railway.

== See also ==
- Kerava
- Korso
- Söderkulla
