= Kajaani Castle =

Castle in Kajaani, Finland

- Kajaanin linna Kajaneborg
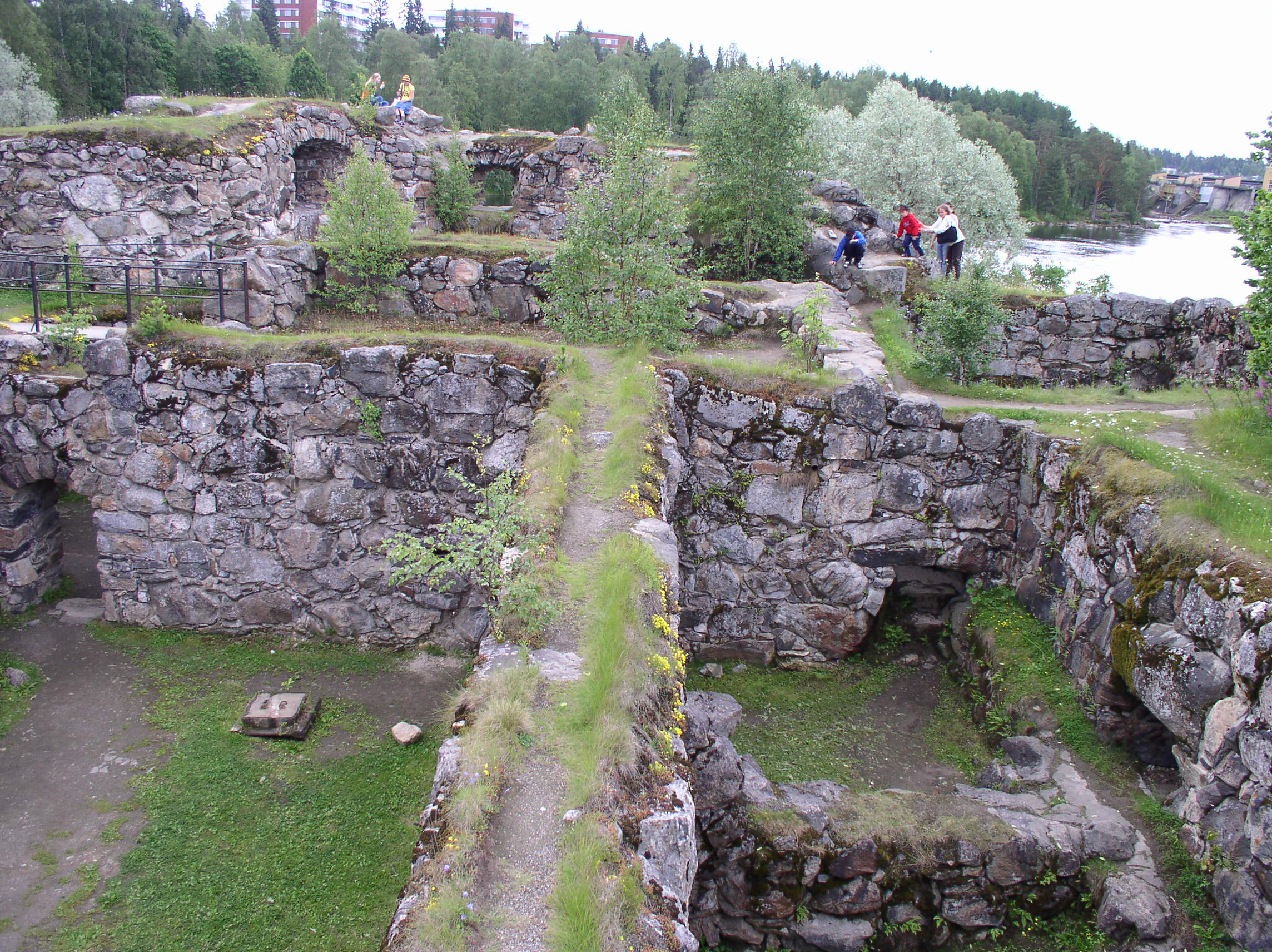
- Kajaani Castle ruins
- Interactive map of the Kajaani Castle area

General information
- Type: Medieval castle
- Location: Kajaani, Finland, Brahenkatu 1; FI-81700 Kajaani; Finland
- Coordinates: 64°13′45″N 027°43′58″E
- Construction started: 1604
- Completed: 1619
- Destroyed: 1716
- Owner: Finnish Heritage Agency

Design and construction
- Main contractor: Charles IX of Sweden

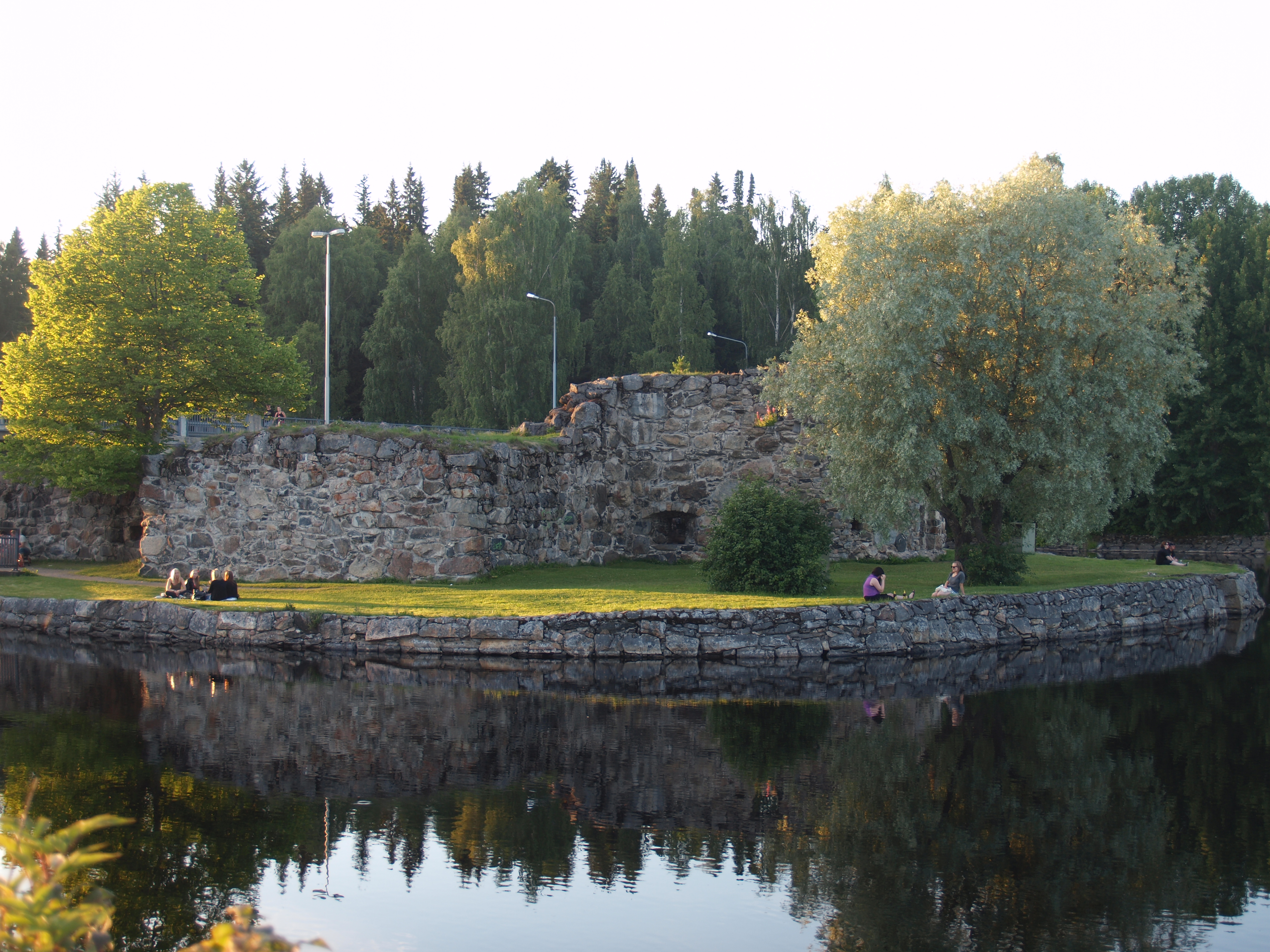
The ruins of Kajaani Castle are on an island in the middle of the Kajaaninjoki River. Today, a bridge spans the island.

The Kajaani Castle (Finnish: Kajaanin linna, Swedish: Kajaneborg, Kajaneborgs slott, older spelling Cajanaborg) is a ruined fortress built of granite in Kajaani. The castle was built in the early 17th century on an islet in the river Kajaaninjoki, between the Ämmäkoski and Koivukoski rapids in Kainuu, present-day Finland. It was the last medieval-style stone castle constructed in Sweden.

The castle was built at a strategically valuable site to protect the region of Kainuu which had been ceded to Sweden in the Treaty of Teusina in 1595. Construction was started by king Charles IX of Sweden in 1604. Construction progressed slowly, and king Gustav II Adolf ordered its interruption in 1619. The incomplete castle was first used as a prison.

The castle experienced its peak during the tenure of Count Per Brahe the Younger from 1650s to 1670s. The town of Kajaani was founded in 1651 next to the castle, and plans were made to transform the castle into a noble residence. However, in 1681, the fief was abolished during the Great Reduction, and the castle reverted to serving as a simple administrative center for Sweden's northernmost territories. During the Great Northern War, Russian forces besieged the castle and destroyed it with explosives in 1716. Today, only its roofless ruins remain.

The castle's military significance was lost in 1809 when Finland became part of the Russian Empire. However, the island of Linnasaari and the bridge over it remained as an important crossing point of the Kajaaninjoki. Archeological interest in the castle awoke in the 1930s when old objects were discovered during the construction of the new bridge made of steel-reinforced concrete. After this the castle was restored many times, and during the 1930s the brick patches installed during its earlier restoration in the 1890s were replaced with granite.

== History ==
=== From construction to ruin ===
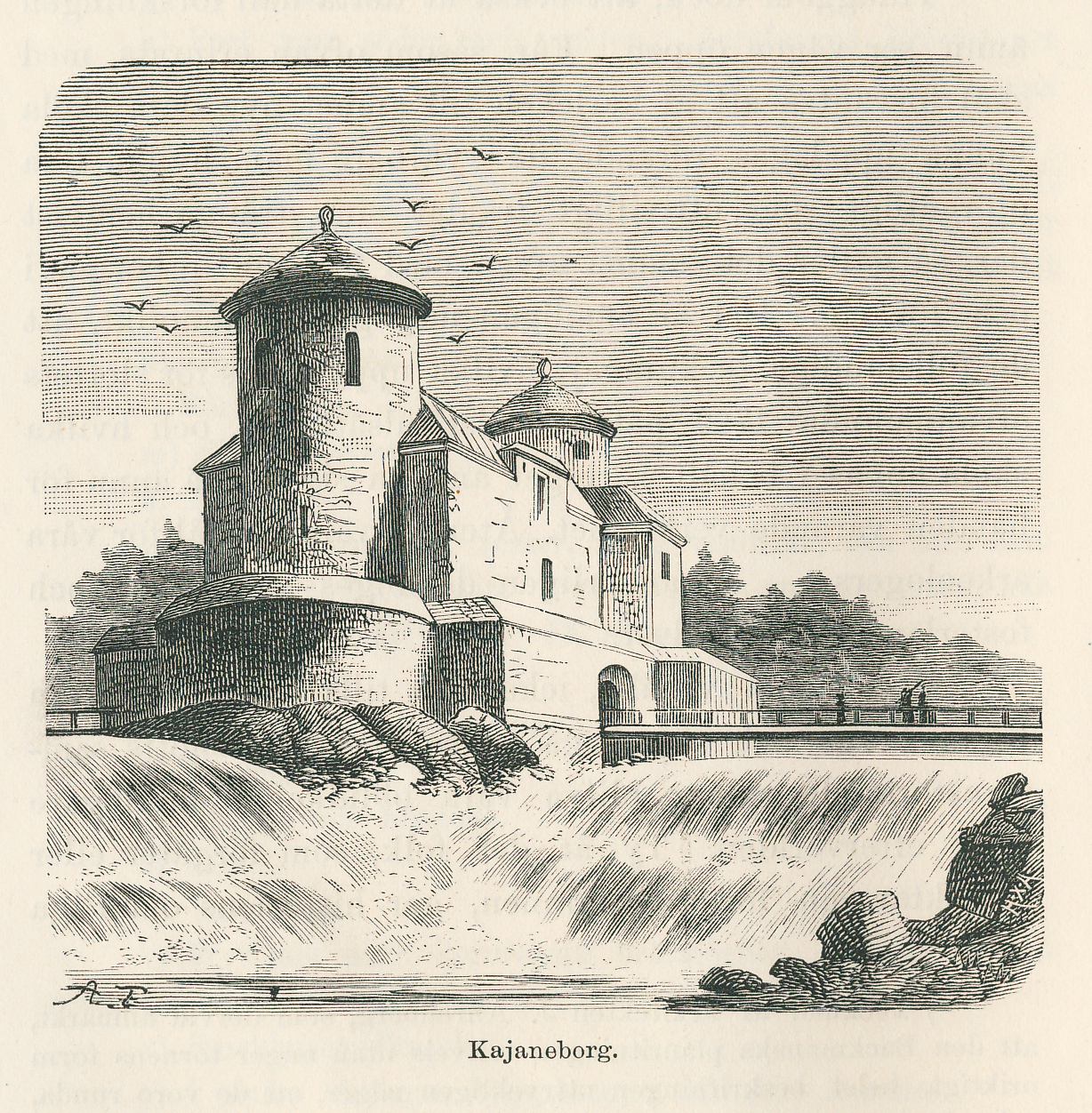
A reconstruction drawing by Jac Ahrenberg in 1882

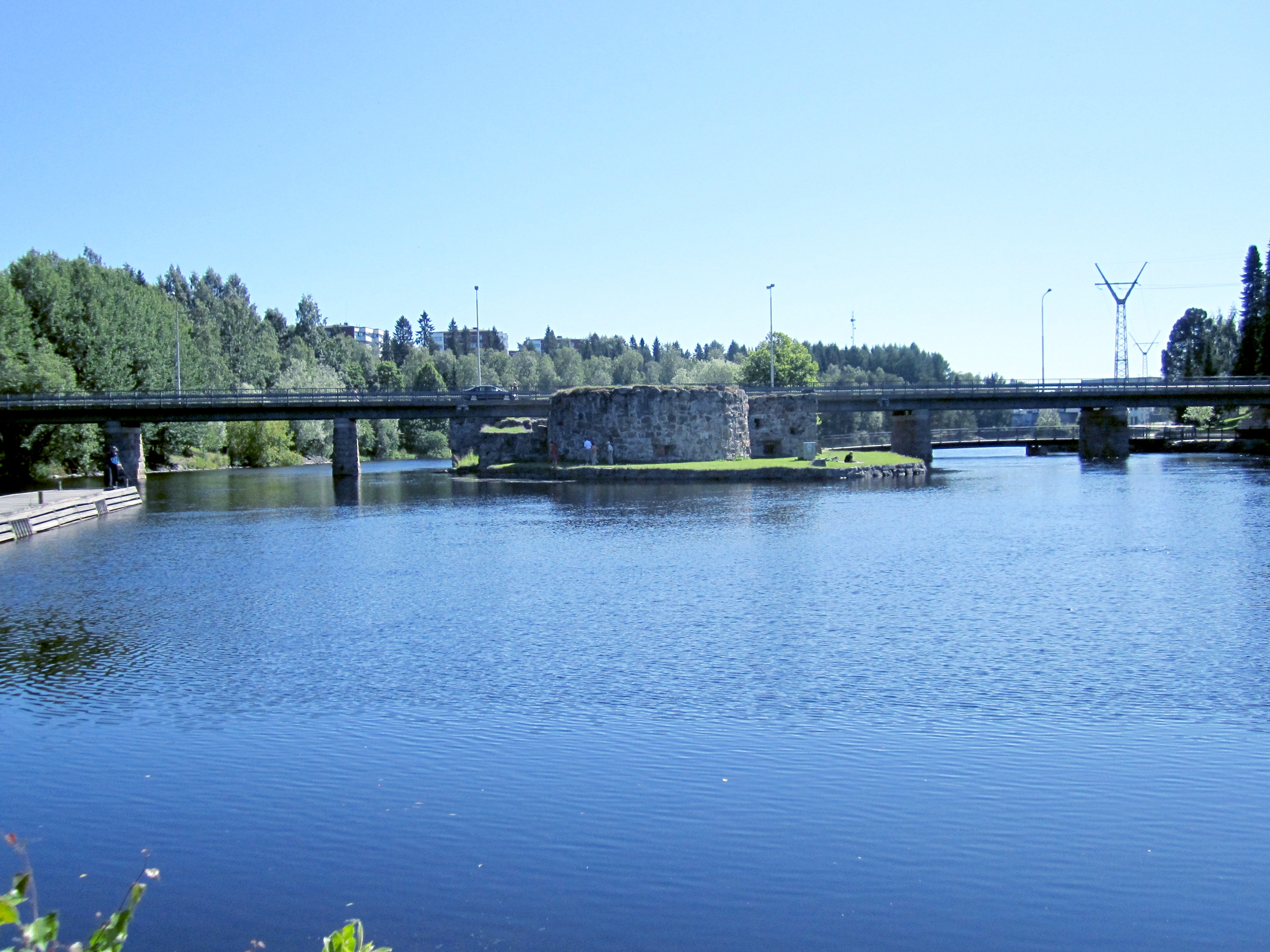
The Kajaani Castle was built on an island on the river Kajaaninjoki.

Construction of the Kajaani castle was started by Clemens Eriksson by order from king Charles IX of Sweden in 1604. The foundation was started in 1604 at a natural nodal point of various passageways, and actual construction was started in 1605. The small islet that was chosen for the foundation proved to be far too small to support a castle, so it was enlarged by piling and embankment. The original walls of the castle rose up directly from the rapids.

In the early 17th century, King Charles IX founded both the city of Oulu and the Kajaani Castle in northern Finland. He wanted to strengthen the position of power of Sweden in the Kainuu region which had been ceded to Sweden at the Treaty of Teusina in 1595. In addition, the castle would protect both existing and new inhabitants of Kainuu from Russian raids. Upon completion, the Kajaani Castle became the northernmost stone castle in Europe. There was discussion in the late 20th century about whether there had previously been any castle or other building at the site before the 17th century. An argument towards the view that there had been previous buildings was that the location was strategically important. There has been no evidence of prior buildings, and so the researcher Heikki Rytkölä from the Museum of Kainuu thinks of the view that there had been prior buildings as too daring.

The castle was constructed on an island on the rapids of the Kajaaninjoki to the east of lake Oulujärvi. In 1606 the king gave an order to admiral Isak Behm that the castle should be surrounded by a wall. A The castle had to be able to defend itself against any possible siege, and because of that king Charles IX appointed the master builder Isak Rasmusson and two journeymen to oversee its construction. Construction progressed slowly as there was a shortage of labour and material at the site. To lessen the shortage of labour the king ordered the peasants living in the area to help with the construction on six work days per year.

In 1610, King Charles IX ordered Isak Behm to be detained because he had refused to obey the king's order to attack and occupy the Russian border outpost Soma. Erich Persson Hare replaced him as the castle's commander, and construction of the castle was slowed down again. After five years of work Rasmusson resigned from his post as the master builder "because of blindness" and returned to Sweden in 1615. In reality, Rasmusson had been almost completely blind for several years, and his journeyman Lars Thomasson had been in charge of the construction since 1613. Because of this, the construction took a long time.

After the Treaty of Stolbovo in 1617 the area started losing its strategic value, and in 1619, King Gustav II Adolf ordered construction of the Kajaani Castle to be interrupted. At this point, the granite castle was rectangular in shape with a half-rounded turret at both ends. At first, the castle only consisted of a stone wall, two round towers, and wooden buildings in the yard inside the castle. All buildings inside the castle walls were made of wood. After all construction had been stopped, Erich Hare resigned from his post as the castle commander and captain Christopher Wernstedt replaced him as the castle's temporary commander for two years. He was ordered not to do anything other than "repair and maintain the building".

Since Gustaf II Adolf had ordered work on the castle to be interrupted, the castle was left without a commander as such, but on 22 September 1623 Erik Pederson was appointed as the castle commander. The castle had still been left unfinished, and during its first years it functioned as an administrative centrum, prison, and military strongpoint. The castle was seen as a good place to deport prisoners to as it was located in a far-away wasteland. The most famous prisoner was the historian Johannes Messenius (imprisoned 1616 – 1635), a professor at the Uppsala University, sentenced to prison because of his contact with the Jesuits and the Pope, who was forced to live in the poor conditions of the castle from 1616 to 1635, after which he was transferred to Oulu in 1636. During the imprisonment period, Messenius wrote a work of fifteen parts masterpiece concerning the history of Scandinavia called Scondia Illustrata, which was published more than 60 years later, between the years in 1700–1705 in Stockholm. Another famous prisoner at the castle was the famous Swedish author and adventurer Lars Wivallius (imprisoned 1634 – 1641).

The first nine part within the content of the Scondia illustrata form a chronicle called the Chronologia, which describes the history of Scandinavian people starting from times of the Genesis flood narrative until the Gustavus Adolphus reign ergo from 1611 to 1632. The remaining six volumes deal with the history of Finland and the Baltic Vendies and contain additions to the previous volumes.

Erik Pedersson continued to serve as the castle commander up to 20 April 1641 when Per Jakobson Tysk from colonel Bielke's regiment succeeded him as the castle commander. No further construction was done at the Kajaani Castle as Tysk was ordered to serve at the field.

In 1650, Count Per Brahe the Younger received the Freiherrdom of Kajaani as his fiefdom, and in the next year he founded the city of Kajaani next to the castle. Brahe wanted his fiefdom to be administrated from luxurious administrative buildings, so he ordered major additional construction to the castle to convert into a castle for the nobility from 1661 to 1666. Count Per Brahe ordered major additional construction of the castle in the 1650s, which was completed in 1666. During this construction, many wooden structures of the castle were replaced with stone structures to form a fortress. Samuel Lång finished the construction in 1665, raising the walls on the inner yard as high as the outer walls. The Kajaani Castle remained as the main building of the Kajaani Freiherrdom until 1681, when the fiefdom was discontinued during the Great Reduction. The castle once again became a castle for the fogd, whose responsibilities included defence of the area.

The Great Northern War started in 1700, and Kajaani and its nearby villages were burned to the ground in 1712. After this, Lieutenant Colonel Johan von Meurman, the commander of the castle, started strengthening the defence of the castle. The upper floors of the towers were converted to better fit cannons, a three-metre-thick layer of peat was laid on top of the walls, the doors and windows were covered and various hindrances were placed on the coasts. The Kajaani Castle was Sweden's last line of defence in Finland after the Olavinlinna castle had fallen in 1714. In March 1715 Russian troops started arriving outside the Kajaani Castle demanding its immediate surrender. The defence held on, and the Russians stayed away for over half a year. The Russians returned in December 1715, when General Fyodor Chekin arrived with about four thousand men while the defence of the castle only numbered around fifty men. The Russian forces besieged the castle for five weeks until its commander, Johan Henrik Fieandt, finally agreed to surrender the castle on 24 February 1716 because of lack of food, firewood, and ammunition. The Russians had promised to let the defence forces go and allow them to retain their property. These promises were not kept, and the Russian forces took nearly everything with them and deported both the soldiers and the civilians as prisoners to Turku and to Russia. Shortly after this, General Chekin blasted the castle in March 1716.

=== From ruin to restoration ===
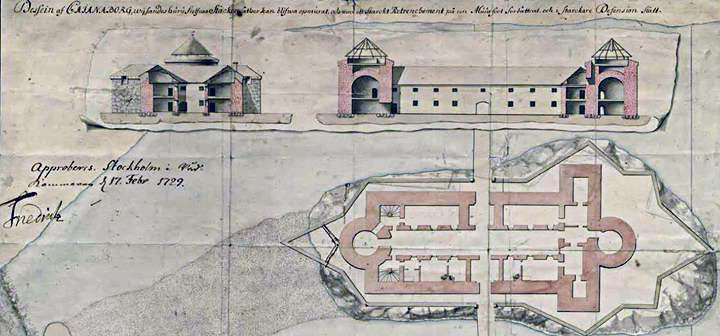
Several architectural drawings from 1729 to 1731 for the plan to rebuild the Kajaani Castle have been preserved at the collections of the military archive of Sweden.

The Kajaani Castle returned to Sweden at the Treaty of Nystad in 1721, and there were several proposals to rebuild it. The castle held a small garrison until the 1790s, but the walls deteriorated and the stones of the castle were being reused to build houses. When Finland became part of the Russian Empire in 1809, the castle lost its military significance entirely. The Linnansaari island remained as an important crossing point of the river and the old wooden bridges were kept maintained. In 1845 a new wooden bridge was built over the ruins, and it remained in use for almost a century until a new concrete bridge was built. In order to build the foundation for the wooden bridge the middle part of the ruins was lowered and some stones were taken from the area to build the foundation.

The first repair work of the ruins of the castle started in 1890 with a grant from the Senate of Finland. In addition, the board of construction, which served as the actual operator of the work, used its own money for the restoration. At the time, the castle had lain in ruins for almost two centuries, and its bottom and rooms were covered in several metres of soil and rock. In addition, the walls were in such a bad shape that there was fear they would fall down. The plans for the restoration were made by the famous restoration architect Johan Jacob Ahrenberg. The repairs of the castle from 1890 to 1892 were conducted badly: places where rock had fallen down were patched with bricks and the ruins were lowered. These brick patches remained in place until the ruins were repaired again from 1910 to 1911.

The old wooden bridge became too narrow and weak for the growing car traffic in the early 20th century. In summer 1936, construction of a new bridge from steel-reinforced concrete started. The old objects found during the excavation for the foundation of the bridge gave rise to a demand for restoring the ruins. The Parliament of Finland approved a grant for excavation and restoration work which started in July 1937. A layer of several metres of soil and rock was removed from the castle and its walls were repaired and raised. The brick patches left in place from the previous attempt at restoration were replaced with granite stones. About 1,800 old objects were recovered during the repairs. By initiative of the City of Kajaani, a new restoration project took place from 2001 to 2008. During the project, the Finnish Heritage Agency repaired the walls and researched its construction history, and the city built a new pedestrian bridge to the island. New road signs were made to improve the accessibility and tourism, and a restoration report and website were made. In 2014 the Kajaani Castle went under the care of the nature services of the Metsähallitus agency of forestry along with 28 other valuable cultural heritage sites.

== Architecture ==
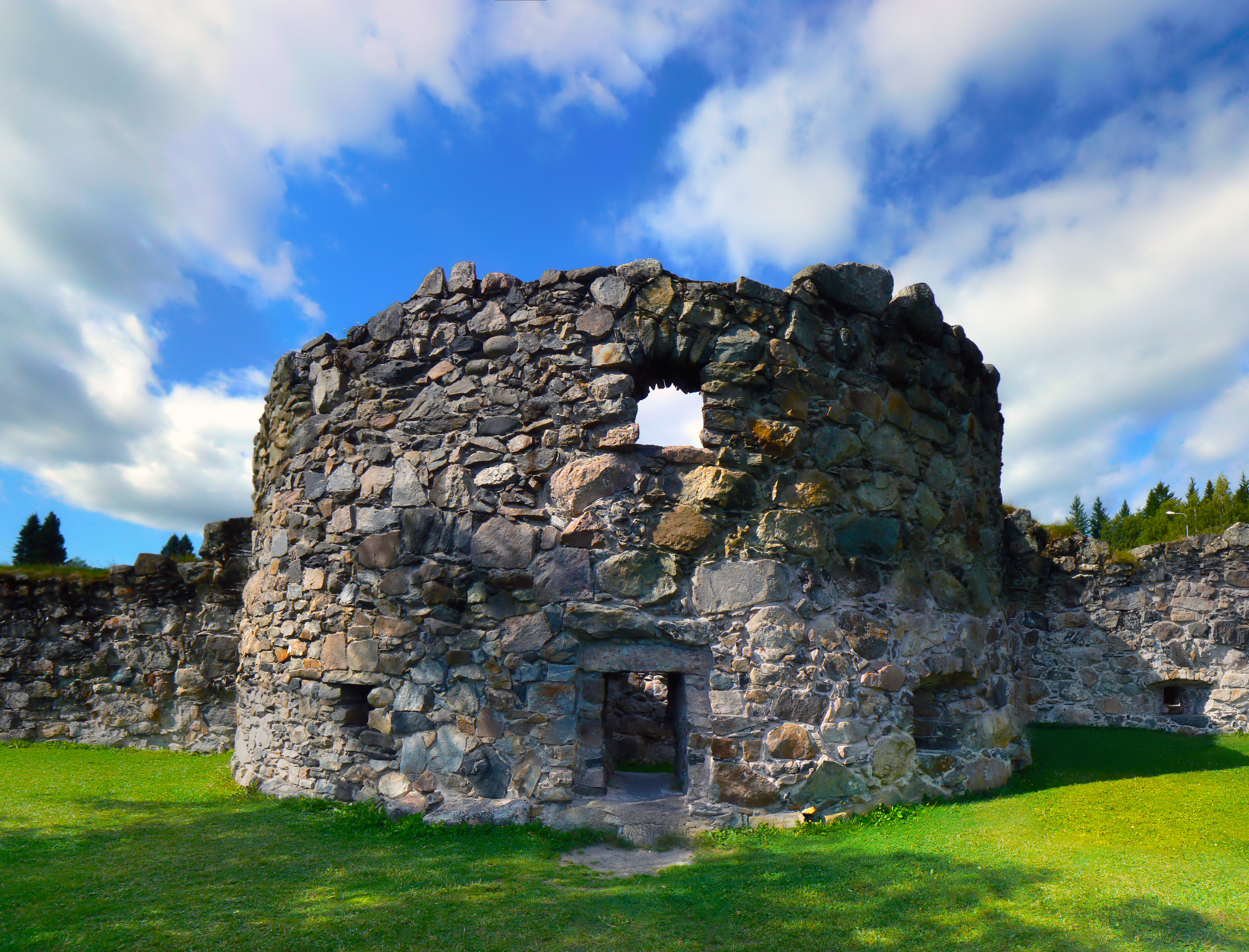
The remains of a tower at the Kajaani Castle

The castle was built from natural rock mined and collected from nearby areas. The rocks in the walls vary in appearance, as several types of rock were seen as suitable for building. To acquire lime mortar used for the walls, limestone was probably mined from the Melalahti area in Paltamo. The outer walls of castles were mostly covered in a thin layer of lime mortar, and traces of white limestone have been preserved in the Kajaani Castle. The embrasures for the windows were red.

In the first stage of construction completed in 1619 the castle had two round artillery towers and a one-story-high outer wall between them. In addition, the castle had two rectangular batteries and a gate tower at the northern gate. The outer wall was about 39 metres long, 9.6 metres high and 3.6 metres thick. There were bridges to the island from the mainland both in the north and from the south. The northern bridge was 50 metres long and the southern bridge was 91 metres long. The gates were the weak point of the defence, and there were embrasures for archery directed towards them. There were drawbridges in front of the gates. Very little information of the structure of these drawbridges remains.

The wooden living facilities were later replaced with stone houses. As the plans for them included arched roofs, four walls were made for each house even though they were attached to the outer wall. The stone houses were designed as double houses: in the middle of each house was a porch with entrances to both houses inside the building. The chancellery building was two stories high, and its middle floor was made of wood. The upper stories could be reached by staircases on the outside of the building. The stone walls of the rooms were covered in white limestone. The house of the castle commander had a brick floor while the other rooms probably had a wooden floor. There were four rooms, a gunpowder storage room, a living room, a porch and a kitchen with a cellar underneath it attached to the northern outer wall. From 1669 onwards there was a so-called great hall on the second story of the eastern tower.

== Archaeology ==
Ior Bock wrote in his story collection Bockin perheen saaga that there had been another castle at the site before the Kajaani Castle was built, with a treasure dating back to the Crusades hidden in the well. This story led to a private company conducting ground radar scanning, where an observed reflection was said to refer to a large metal object at a depth of about 2.5 metres. Henrik Lilius, the chief of the museum board proposed that one possible explanation for the reflection visible in the ground radar could be an old cannon that had been left underground. Researchers from the Oulu University later made similar observations. In June 2006, the archeologist Kari Uotila conducted digging at the site and found an electric cable at the depth of 40 centimetres, which probably was the object visible in the radar. The digging found no sign of the well mentioned in Bock's work. In addition, the soil at the place where the sign of a metal object was noticed was untouched so it was impossible that anything would have been hidden there. In December 2006 researchers from the Oulu University conducted further ground radar scanning but did not find any sign of a large metal object any more.

== In literature ==
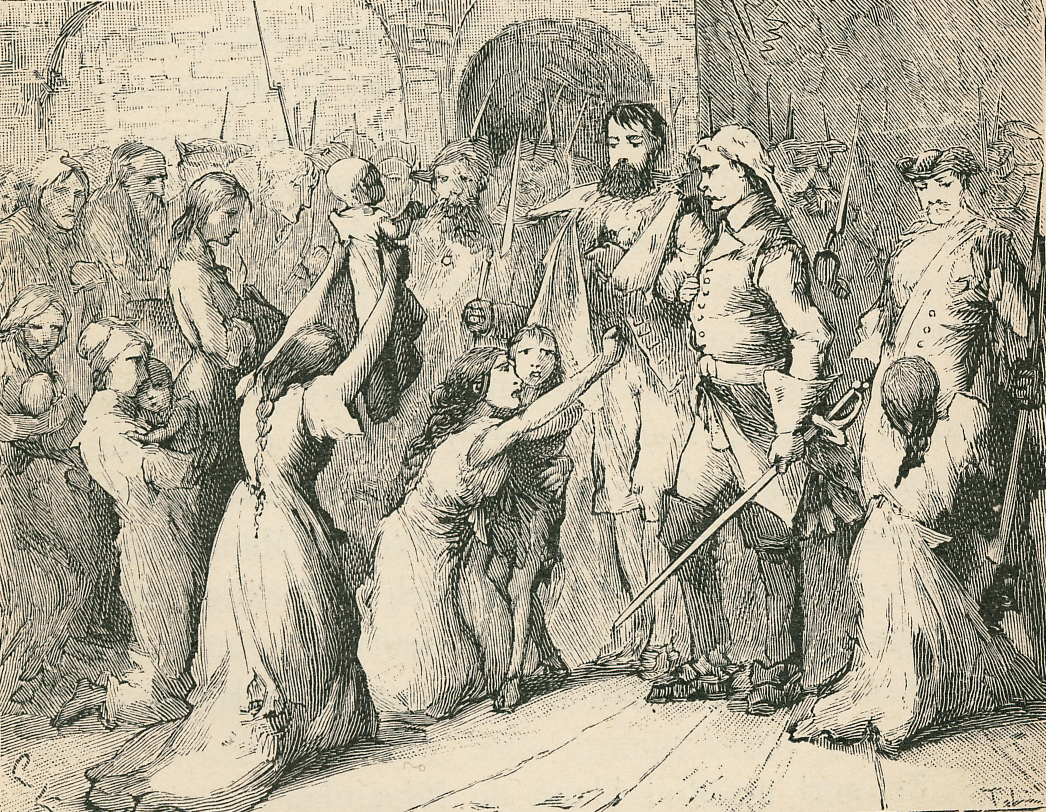
Fieandt, the commander of the Kajaani Castle, surrounded by families seeking refuge in the castle. Carl Larsson's illustration to the novel Fältskärns berättelser from 1884.

Zachris Topelius's historical novel Fältskärns berättelser touches on the subject of the Kajaani Castle and its history at two points. In the first episode of the novel one of the main characters, the cavalry captain Kustaa Bertel, meets his lover princess Regina von Emmeritz at the castle in 1635. The plot also includes the castle's most famous prisoner, the Swedish historian Johannes Messenius and the Catholic Jesuit Hieronymus in his political schemes. In the third episode of the novel during the Great Northern War in 1776 the character Kustaa Bertelsköld, a Carolean wounded in the war, bears witness along with his wife in the castle to the Russian siege and the castle's surrender. The events also include the real historical persons the castle's commander Johan Henrik Fieandt and the Paltamo-born strongman Daniel Cajanus ("Daniel the Tall") who later achieved fame throughout Europe, who in Topelius's story explodes the castle's gunpowder cellar at the age of thirteen and so causes the destruction of the castle conquered by the enemy.

The siege of the Kajaani Castle and the desperate situation of the women and children seeking refuge there was described by Eino Leino in his first printed poem Kajaanin linna (Hämeen Sanomat 26 September 1890). In the poem, the mind of the castle's strict commander Fieandt is torn between pity and military duty. Also Ilmari Calamnius's poem Mennyttä muistellessa, tulevaa toivoessa the ruins of the Kajaani Castle first bring images of its warlike past to mind, but the poet heralds the construction of a new castle, where the "idea of light" is flown as the flag and the castle is commanded by "the power of the spirit". The poem, which premiered at a lottery in Kajaani in 1896, was also printed in the Joukahainen album of the Nation of Ostrobothnia (issue #11/1897).

The Kajaani Castle played an important part in the journalist-writer Jussi Kukkonen's historical novels. The novel Kainuu palaa (1942) touches on the subject of the so-called "Field War", referring to the Russian raid to the Kajaani area in 1712. In the novel, the castle acts as a base for the military activity of the local peasants trying to hold their ground against the invaders. The character gallery also includes the infamous major Simon Affleck ("Hurtta"). The novel Vangittu karoliini (1946), telling the story of the castle commander Johan Henrik Fieandt and his family, begins with the castle's defence battle against an overwhelming enemy. Daniel Cajanus also plays a part in Kukkonen's novel following Fieandt's family to prison and on their escape back to freedom.

The poem collection Kajaneborg 1636 written by the Finland-Swedish poet Lars Huldén in 2010 describes the life and thoughts of the castle's famous prisoners, the historian Johannes Messenius and the poet-adventurer Lars Wivallius during their long and heavy years in prison in the 17th century. Juha Seppälä has also described Messenius's fate in prison in his play Kajaanin linnan vanki which premiered at the Kajaani City Theatre in 2001.

== Stamps ==
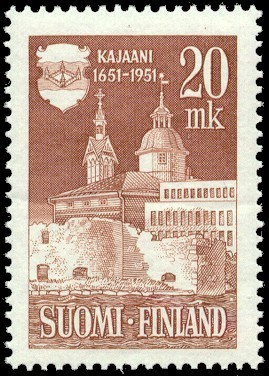
The stamp to commemorate Kajaani's 300th anniversary

On 7 July 1951 a brown stamp worth 20 markka was published in Finland to commemorate the 300th anniverasy of the city of Kajaani. The stamp shows the ruins of the Kajaani Castle as well as the Koivukoski power plant and the towers of the Kajaani Church designed by Johan Jacob Ahrenberg (1896) and the Kajaani City Hall designed by Carl Ludvig Engel (1831).

== See also ==
- Brahe Castle
- Oulu Castle
