= Temple of Lemminkäinen =

Cave in Sipoo, Finland

Coordinates: 60°15′47.54401″N 25°19′27.84457″E

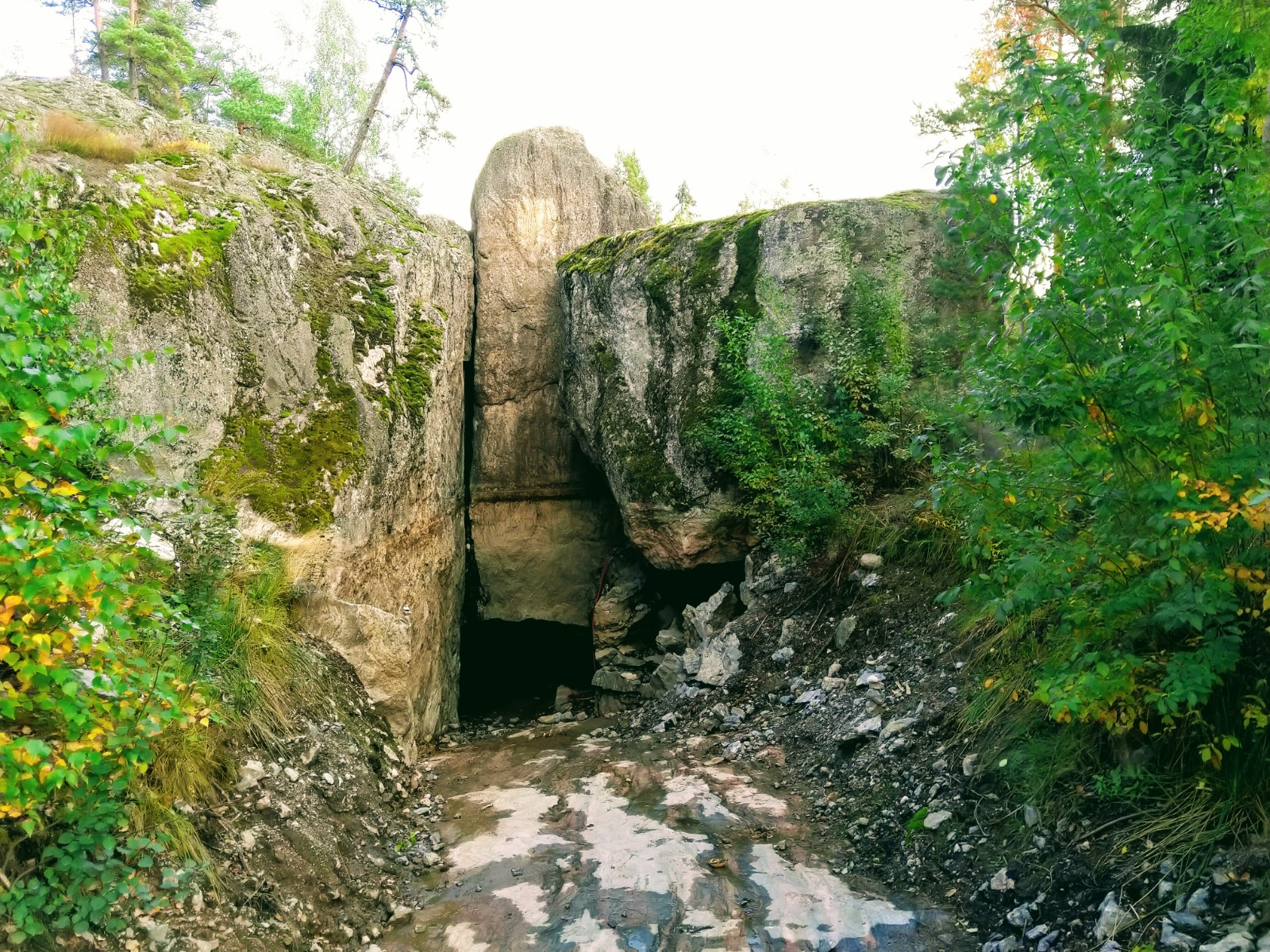
Entrance of the Temple of Lemminkäinen

The Temple of Lemminkäinen (Finnish: Lemminkäisen temppeli) is a cave in the village of Gumbostrand, located in Sipoo, Finland. It is said to contain an underground temple depicted in The Bock Saga, a collection of stories by Ior Bock: according to Bock, the entrance to the temple is located under a rock that Bock calls Kyypelivuori. The name of the cave refers to Lemminkäinen, a figure in Finnish mythology and one of the main characters in the Kalevala. According to Bock, the entrance to the temple was closed in 987, when Christianity arrived in Uusimaa and pagan sites had to be hidden.

During excavations carried out between 1987 and 1999, a tunnel about 50 meters long was opened under the rock, but no temple was found. Due to lack of money, the excavation was not continued. The Finnish Heritage Agency characterises the site as a natural formation and does not believe that anything of archaeological significance can be found there.

Marcus Lundqvist, a member of the Tempelberg Association, has found an ax blade at the bottom of the excavated cave, which, according to the Finnish Heritage Agency, may date from the 12th century.

In the summer of 2007, the excavation project was scheduled to continue, but it did not materialise. Juha Javanainen, the editor of Bock's book, said in October 2010 that he hoped that the excavation could start again some day.

Carl Borgen, who has published several books about Bock's claims, stated that a group of treasure hunters known as the "Temple Twelve" would continue to dig in the summer of 2022.

== See also ==
- Ior Bock
- Lemminkäinen
