= Kokemäki Castle =

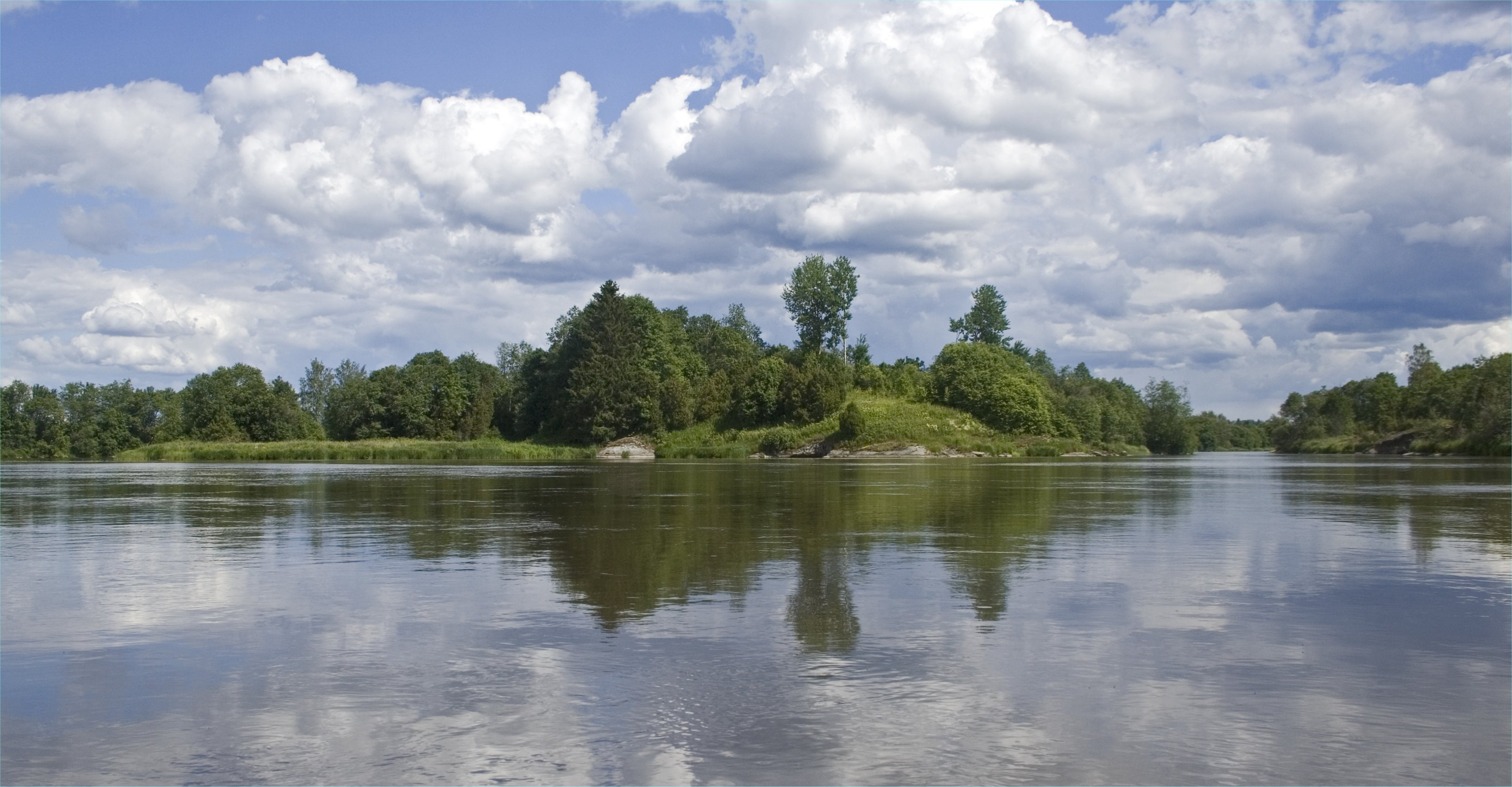
- Linnaluoto Island, site of the Kokemäki Castle
- Interactive map of the Kokemäki Castle area

General information
- Type: Medieval castle
- Location: Kokemäki, Finland
- Coordinates: 61.274386°N 22.302661°E
- Completed: 1324–25
- Demolished: 1367

Kokemäki Castle (Finnish: Kokemäen linna, Swedish: Kumo slott) was a Medieval castle in Kokemäki in the province of Satakunta in Finland. The time of its foundation is unclear, but the castle was most likely completed in 1324–25. It was demolished in 1367 by order of King Albert, as the local residents complained of heavy taxation for the upkeep of the castle. The castle was located on the Linnaluoto Island in the river Kokemäenjoki.

== History ==
Kokemäki Castle was the administrative centre of Kokemäenkartano slottslän. Its function was similar to that of the castles of Turku, Häme and Vyborg, which are still preserved today. The only known reference to Kokemäki Castle is King Albert's warrant for the demolition and relocation of the castle, dated 12 July 1367. It was probably built of limestone and equipped with a round tower. In 1364–65 Kokemäki Castle was besieged by the army of King Albert as the castle was under the rule of Magnus IV of Sweden.

Archaeological excavations were made in 1885. Various items were found which were dated to the late Bronze Age, as well as to the 13th and 14th century. After the demolition of Kokemäki Castle a new castle, Aborch, was established. Location of this castle is uncertain, since it was disbanded in the 1410s. It was probably built 1.5 kilometres (0.9 mi) upstream at the same location as the later Kokemäenkartano manor.

== See also ==
- Liinmaa Castle
