= Liinmaa Castle =

Coordinates: 61°13′04″N 021°36′33″E

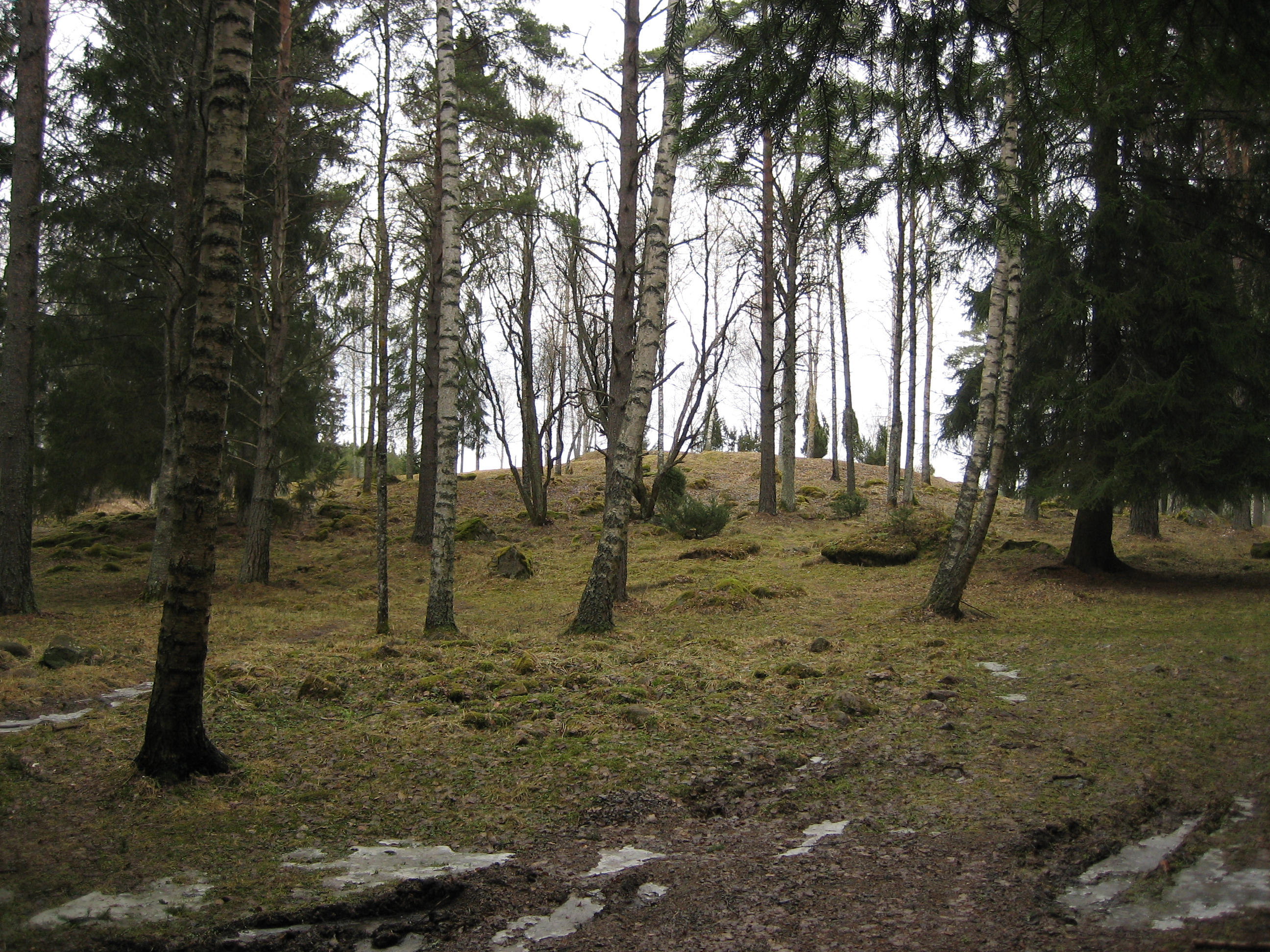
Location of Liinmaa Castle

Liinmaa Castle (Finnish: Liinmaan linna, Swedish: Vreghdenborg) was a medieval castle in Eurajoki in the province of Satakunta in Finland. The castle was made of wood and bricks, and only some earth walls remain today. According to excavations in the 1970s and 2004–2005, it was in usage during the 14th and 15th centuries. The site is lightly looked-after.

The castle was first mentioned in 1395, and was named after Dietrich Vieregge (Wereghede), a german noble mercenary serving Swedish King Albrekt av Mecklenburg.

== See also ==
- Kokemäki Castle
