= Oulu Castle =

Former defensive castle in Oulu, Finland

Coordinates: 65°01′02″N 025°28′02″E

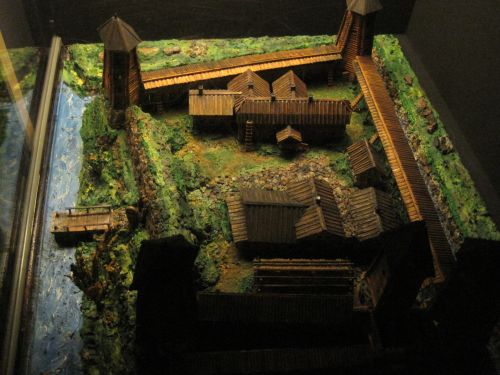
A diorama of the wooden Oulu Castle

Oulu Castle (Swedish: Uleåborgs slott, Finnish: Oulun linna) was a late defense castle in Oulu, Finland. It was built on an island in the delta of Oulu River in 1590. The castle was mostly made of wood and earth walls. There probably was an earlier medieval castle on the same site latest by 1375. The Russian Sofia First Chronicle records that in 1377, men from Novgorod tried to conquer a newly built castle in the Oulu River delta but were unsuccessful.

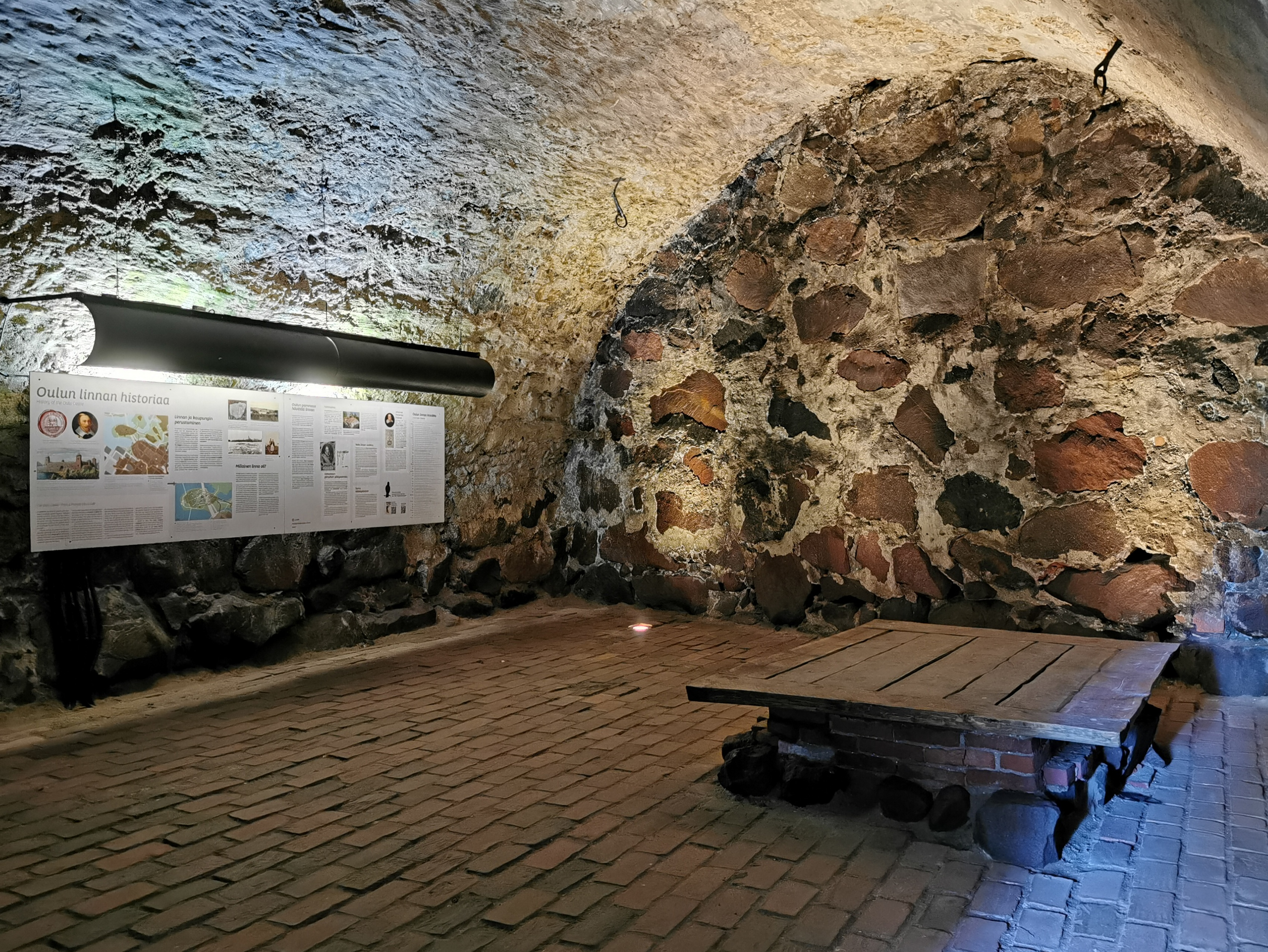
Small exhibition of the Oulu Castle in cellar

The present-day ruins on Linnansaari Island belong to a later castle, built in 1605 by order of King Charles IX. In a decree issued on 8 April 1605, the king first instructed the construction of Kajaani Castle and then ordered the rebuilding of Oulu Castle. The decree stated that the old wooden structures were to be demolished and replaced with a fortified rampart featuring fire shelters around the island.

The castle was severely damaged in 1715 when Russian forces set it on fire during the Great Northern War. Its final destruction took place on 31 July 1793, at 10:45 p.m., when lightning set one of the powder magazines on fire; as a result, the powder cellar exploded and almost completely destroyed the building.

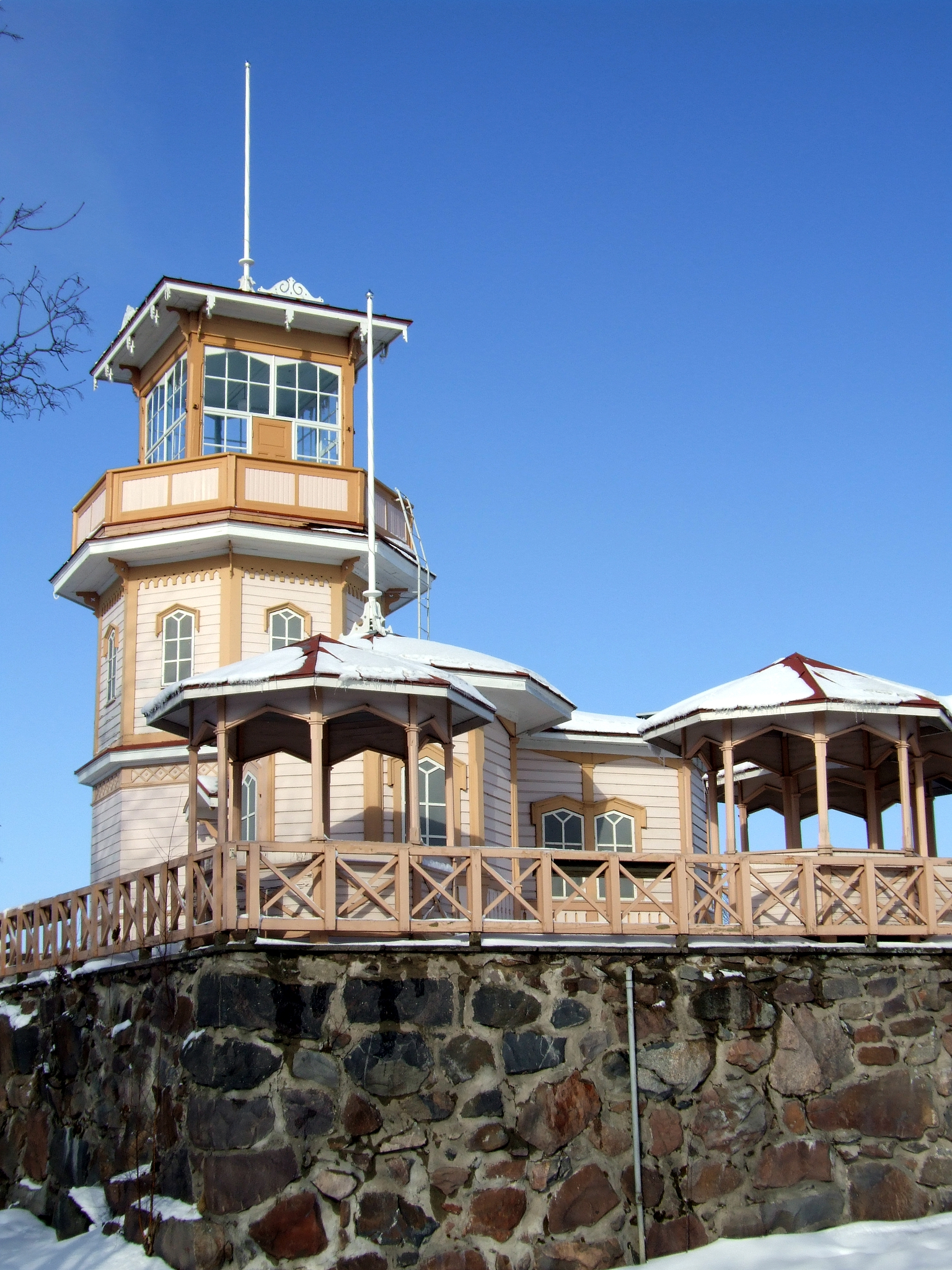
Oulu Castle today, with a former observatory built on the remaining powder magazine.

Wooden constructions on the remaining powder magazine date from 1875 when the Oulu School of Sea Captains built their observatory on the site. The building was designed by architect Wolmar Westling. The building has been a cafeteria since 1912 with a small exhibition on the castle history.

== See also ==
- Brahe Castle
- Kajaani Castle
