= Östersundom =

Coordinates: 60°15′N 25°12′E

Östersundom Östersundom
- Helsinki Subdivision
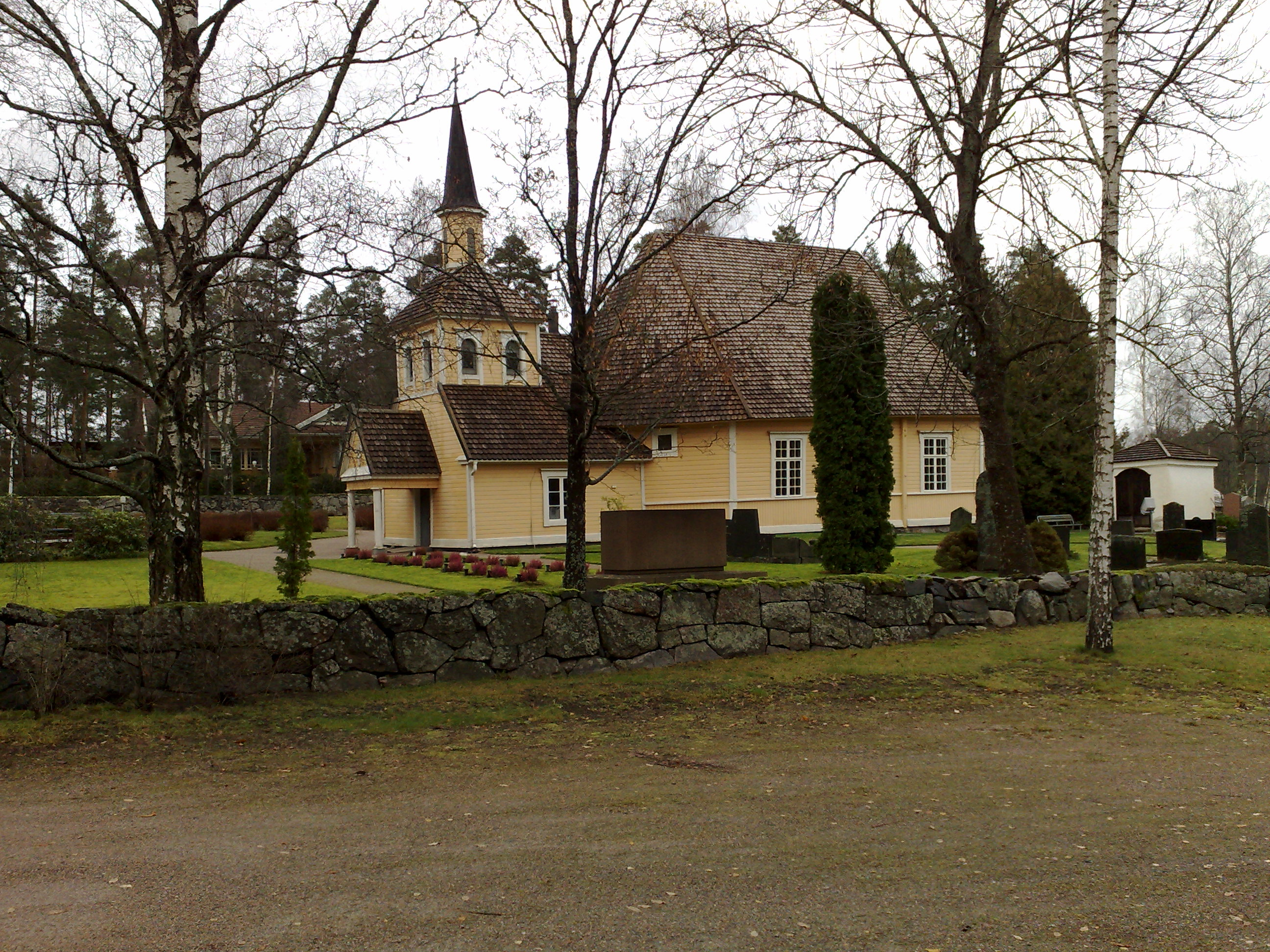
- Östersundom Church

- Position of Östersundom within Helsinki
- Country: Finland
- Region: Uusimaa
- Sub-region: Greater Helsinki
- Municipality: Helsinki
- Population: 542
- Subdivision number: 55
- Neighbouring subdivisions: Salmenkallio, Talosaari, Karhusaari, Ultuna, Vantaa, Sipoo

Östersundom (previously known in Finnish as Itäsalmi) is a subdistrict of Helsinki, Finland, near to the border of Sipoo. The area previously belonged to the municipality of Sipoo, but it was annexed to Helsinki on 1 January 2009 as part of the Southwest Sipoo Association (Finnish: Lounais-Sipoon osakuntaliitos), although the municipality of Sipoo opposed the idea.

Östersundom Manor and its side manor Björkudden, where Zachris Topelius lived for the last years, are located in Östersundom.

== See also ==
- East Helsinki
- Itämetro
- Sipoo
