= Sipoo =

Municipality in Uusimaa, Finland

Sipoo Sipoo – Sibbo
- Municipality
- Sipoon kunta Sibbo kommun
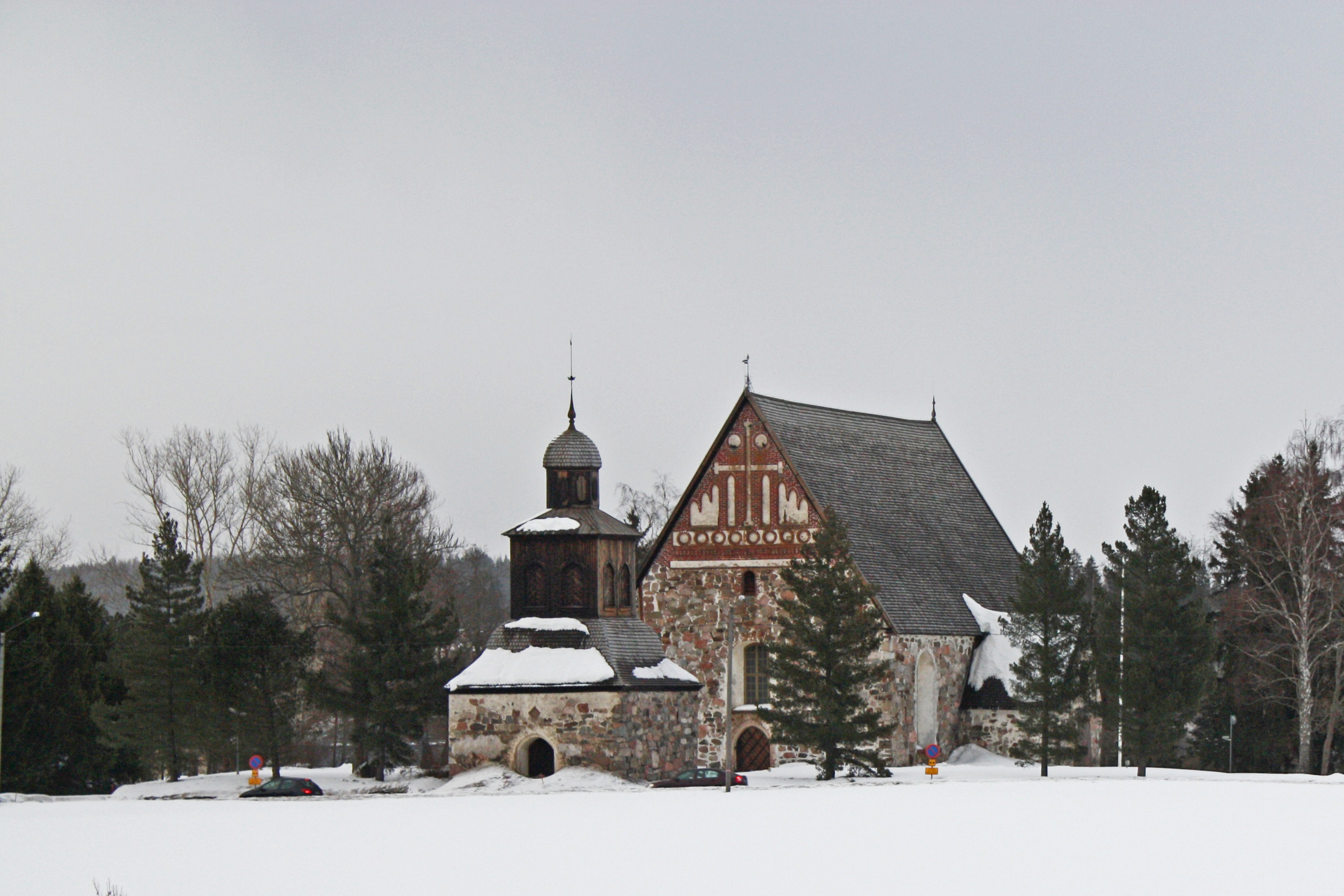
- Sipoo Old Church

- Coat of arms

- Location of Sipoo in Finland
- Interactive map of Sipoo
- Coordinates: 60°22.5′N 025°16′E
- Country: Finland
- Region: Uusimaa
- Sub-region: Helsinki sub-region
- Metropolitan area: Helsinki metropolitan area
- Charter: 1425
- Seat: Nikkilä
- Villages: Paippinen, Söderkulla

Government
  - Chairman of the municipal board: Eero Seppänen
  - Chairman of the municipal assembly: Christel Liljeström
  - Municipal manager: Mikael Grannas

Area (2018-01-01)
  - Total: 698.60 km^{2} (269.73 sq mi)
  - Land: 339.66 km^{2} (131.14 sq mi)
  - Water: 358.97 km^{2} (138.60 sq mi)
  - Rank: 225th largest in Finland

Population (2025-12-31)
  - Total: 23,006
  - Rank: 45th largest in Finland
  - Density: 67.73/km^{2} (175.4/sq mi)

Population by native language
  - Finnish: 65.3% (official)
  - Swedish: 26.8% (official)
  - Others: 7.9%

Population by age
  - 0 to 14: 18%
  - 15 to 64: 64.2%
  - 65 or older: 17.8%
- Time zone: UTC+02:00 (EET)
  - Summer (DST): UTC+03:00 (EEST)
- Climate: Dfb
- Website: www.sipoo.fi/en/

Sipoo (Finnish pronunciation: [ˈsipoː]; Swedish: Sibbo) is a municipality of Finland. It is part of the Helsinki metropolitan area. The municipality has a population of 23,006 (31 December 2025) and covers an area of 698.60 square kilometres (269.73 sq mi) of which 358.97 km^{2} (138.60 sq mi) is water. The population density is 67.73 inhabitants per square kilometre (175.4/sq mi). The administrative center of the municipality is Nikkilä (Swedish: Nickby), which is located 34 kilometres (21 mi) northeast of the center of Helsinki. Another significant urban area is Söderkulla, located in the southern part of the municipality.

Sipoo is a bilingual municipality with Finnish and Swedish as its official languages. The population consists of 65% Finnish speakers, 27% Swedish speakers, and 8% speakers of other languages.

The coat of arms of the municipality refers to the origin story of the settlement, according to which the ancestors of Sipoo are said to have arrived in the region on a viking ship, the bow of which was decorated with a head of wolf; accordingly, locals have even been called the "wolves of Sipoo". The wave lined fess of the coat of arms refers to the Sipoo River.

== Geography ==
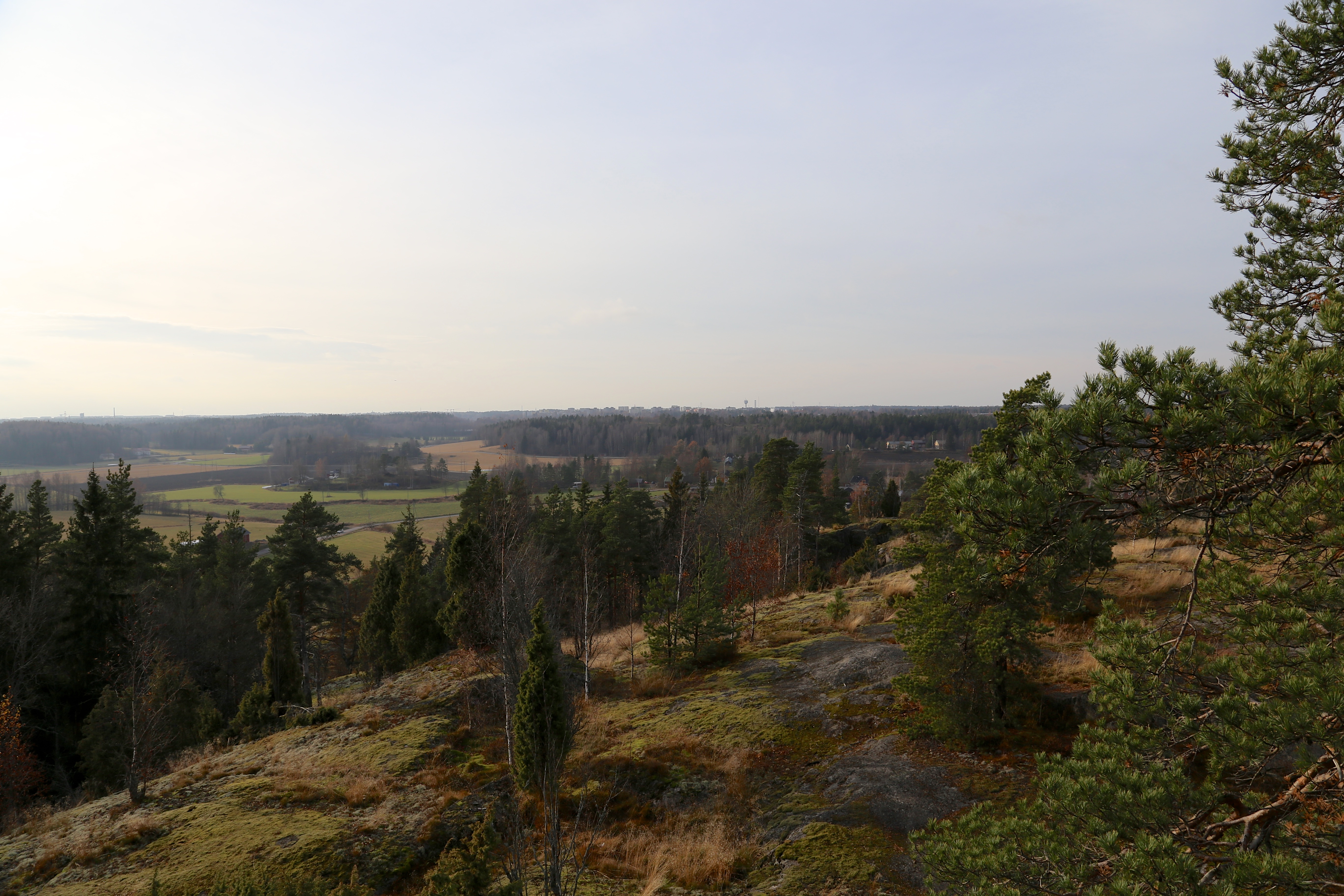
On the hills of the Sipoonkorpi National Park in Sipoo

It is the eastern neighbour of Helsinki and western neighbour of Porvoo, located in the Uusimaa region. Other neighboring municipalities are Vantaa, Kerava, Tuusula, Järvenpää, Mäntsälä and Pornainen. There are two important road connections in the direction of Helsinki from Sipoo: Highway 7, known as the Porvoo Highway (part of E18), and Road 170, which is known as the Itäväylä on the Helsinki side.

The once almost completely Swedish-speaking municipality is bilingual since 1953, a majority being Finnish speakers, due to migration from other parts of Finland since 2003. Today the Finnish-speaking majority stands at 65% and the Swedish-speaking minority comprises about 27% of the population.

On June 26, 2006, the Sipoo town council decided on a strategy to triple the municipality's population over the next 25 years. The decision was made after Helsinki announced plans to annex a part of the municipality in order to continue to build high-end urbanizations by the coastline (and thus high-tax revenue producing). The Finnish Council of State voted in favor of the annexation on June 28, 2007, with an 8 to 4 vote. Sipoo appealed to the Supreme Administrative Court, but the court upheld the decision of the Council of State and the annexation took place on January 1, 2009. As Helsinki did not directly border Sipoo at any point, the city of Vantaa ceded the area lain between Helsinki and Sipoo to Helsinki in the process.

== Demographics ==
Historical population
Year	Pop.	±%
1950	9,409	—
1960	10,442	+11.0%
1970	11,989	+14.8%
1980	12,971	+8.2%
1990	14,671	+13.1%
2000	17,477	+19.1%
2010	18,253	+4.4%
2020	21,687	+18.8%
Source: Doria, Statistics Finland

== Politics ==
Results of the 2019 Finnish parliamentary election in Sipoo:

- Swedish People's Party 25.4%
- National Coalition Party 23.8%
- Finns Party 12.5%
- Social Democratic Party 10.8%
- Green League 9.8%
- Movement Now 5.3%
- Centre Party 4.1%
- Left Alliance 2.9%
- Christian Democrats 2.3%
- Other parties 3.1%

== In popular culture ==
Sipoo is featured in Elisa Viihde network's black comedy television series Duke of Sipoo (Finnish: Sipoon herttua), starring a corrupted Sipolian businessman Pasi Kovalainen, played by Kari Hietalahti.

== International relations ==
=== Twin towns – sister cities ===
- Aurskog-Høland, Norway
- Frederikssund, Denmark
- Kumla, Sweden
- Kuusalu, Estonia

== Notable people ==
- Signe Brander (1869–1942), photographer
- Hjallis Harkimo (born 1953), businessman and politician
- Stéphane Rosse (1962–2024), French cartoonist
- Elina Salo (1936–2025), actress
- Nasty Suicide (born 1963), guitarist for Hanoi Rocks
- Ernst Tandefelt (1876–1948), Finland-Swedish nobleman
- Joona Toivio (born 1988), professional association football player
- Zachris Topelius (1818–1898), Finland-Swedish author, poet and journalist
- Artturi Ilmari Virtanen (1895–1973), Nobel laureate
- Mikael Ylöstalo (1963), Olympian hurdler

== See also ==
- Östersundom
- Pornainen
- Porvoo
- Sibbesborg
- Sipoonkorpi National Park
- Temple of Lemminkäinen
- Vainudden Standing Stone
