= Kainuu =

Region of Finland

Kainuu Kajanaland
- Region
- Region of Kainuu; Kainuun maakunta (Finnish); Landskapet Kajanaland (Swedish)
- Flag Coat of arms

- Kainuu on a map of Finland
- Coordinates: 64°30′N 28°00′E
- Country: Finland
- Historical province: Ostrobothnia
- Capital: Kajaani
- Other towns: Kuhmo, Sotkamo, Suomussalmi

Government
  - Regional Mayor: Riikka Pirkkalainen

Area
  - Total: 22,687.38 km^{2} (8,759.65 sq mi)

Population (2019).
  - Total: 72,306
  - Density: 3.1871/km^{2} (8.2544/sq mi)

GDP
  - Total: €2.111 billion (2015)
  - Per capita: €26,779 (2015)
- Time zone: UTC+2 (EET)
  - Summer (DST): UTC+3 (EEST)
- ISO 3166 code: FI-05
- NUTS: 134
- Regional bird: Siberian jay (Perisoreus infaustus)
- Regional fish: European smelt (Osmerus eperlanus)
- Regional flower: Heather (Calluna vulgaris)
- Regional Stone: Greenschist
- Regional lake: Oulujärvi
- Regional song: Nälkämaan laulu (The Song of the Starving Land)
- Website: www.kainuu.fi/

Kainuu (Finnish pronunciation: [ˈkɑi̯nuː]; Swedish: Kajanaland) is one of the 19 regions of Finland (Finnish: maakunta; Swedish: landskap). Kainuu borders the regions of North Ostrobothnia, North Savo, North Karelia, and Russia (Republic of Karelia).

Culturally, Kainuu is part of the larger Eastern-Finnish cultural heritage. The dialect of Kainuu resembles Savonian and Karelian dialects.

== Geography ==
Taiga is the most common biome in Kainuu. The forest in Kainuu mostly consists of birch, pine, and spruce. The atypical regional geography and landscape consist of lakes, hills, and vast uninhabited forest areas.

The largest lake in the region is Oulujärvi (928.09 km^{2}), one of the largest lakes in Finland. Kainuu's shorelines, open waters, and islands belong to the municipalities of Paltamo and Kajaani.

The highest point in Kainuu is the Iso Tuomivaara (385 m), located in the municipality of Hyrynsalmi. The regional climate is continental. The three most populous urban areas in Kainuu (December 31, 2017) are Kajaani town center (30,028), Vuokatti village (6,207) in Sotkamo municipality, and Kuhmo town center (5,349).

== History ==
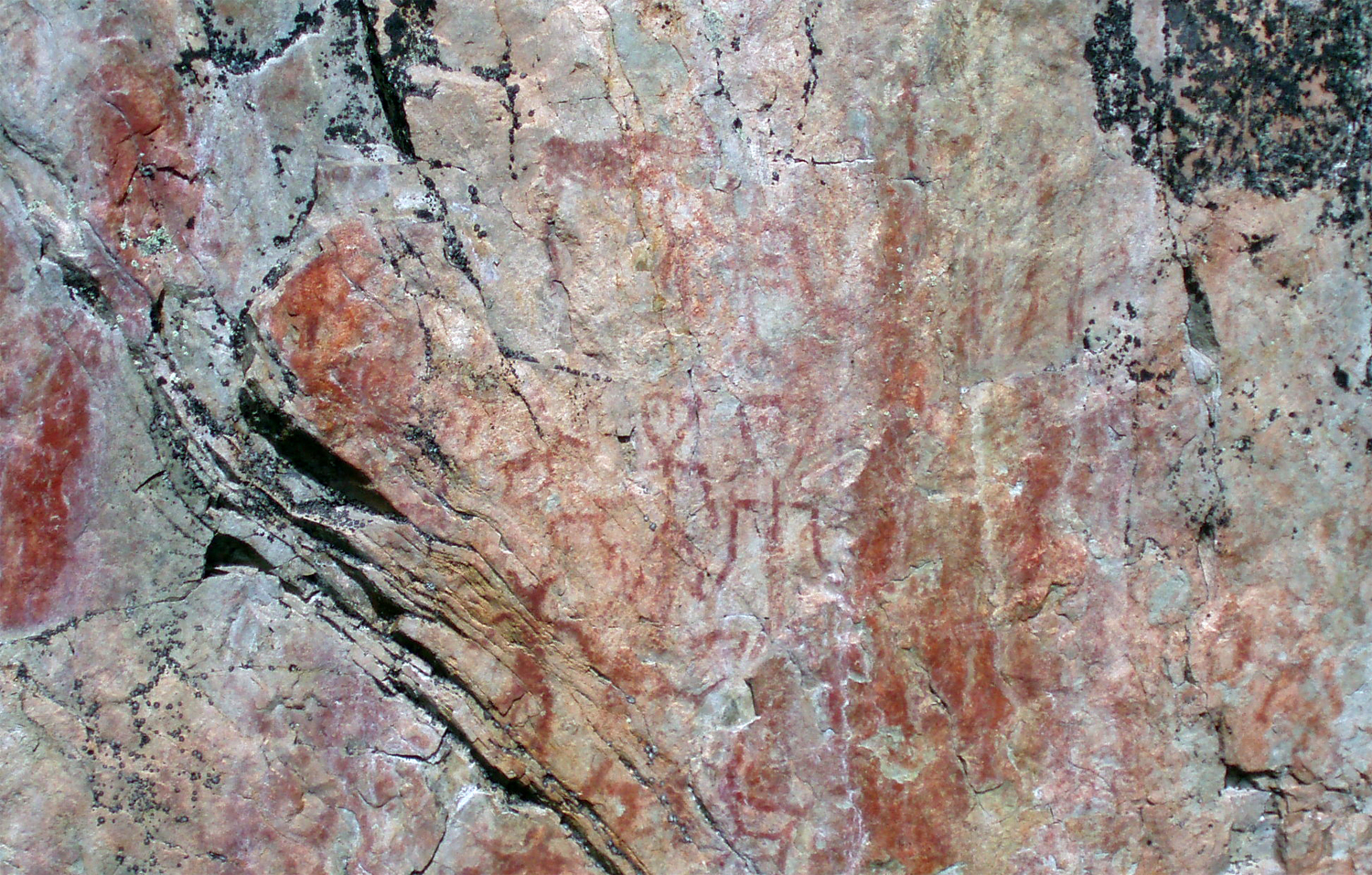
Värikallio pre-historic rock paintings in Suomussalmi, Kainuu.

=== Pre-history ===
The oldest archeological finds of human inhabitation in the area of Kainuu are from around 6800–6000 BCE. The Suomusjärvi culture spread to Kainuu from the south and was strongest around Vaala, which was near the coast of Ancylus Lake. Later finds from the time of the Comb Ceramic culture prove trade connections to the area of Karelia in the east. The Comb Ceramic culture spread to Kainuu quickly, already in the Early Comb Ceramic period (c. 4200–3300 BCE). A style of Comb Ceramic called Säräisniemi Ceramic 1 (Sär 1) emerged in Kainuu, North Ostrobothnia, Southern Lapland, Karelia and Northern Norway. Half of Sär 1 discoveries in Finland are from Kainuu. It is not known where the Sär 1 style originated from, though the area around the Oulujärvi lake has been suggested. Later, when the Comb Ceramic styles of coastal and inland Finland split into two, the style used in Kainuu was Asbestos-ceramic.

Pre-historic people in Kainuu lived by hunting and fishing, most bone findings in human settlements being of beavers and moose. Findings of flax pollen from the turn of the Bronze Age suggest the cultivating of flax c. 1500 BCE in Paltamo. Around the Bronze Age and Early Iron Age (c. 1000–0 BCE), metallic findings from Kainuu become nearly non-existent. Despite this, it is considered to be unlikely that human inhabitation had ended in the area. It is thought that in this time period, the people spoke a Proto-Sámic language, but archaeological findings culturally linked to Sámi have not been found this south. The spread of the Asbestos-ceramic culture in the north of Fennoscandia has been thought to be a sign of the area turning Sámi. The inhabitants of Kainuu in the Early Iron Age were likely then hunter-gathering Sámi, even if genetically and linguistically differing from modern Sámi. If the population density at the time was the same as among Forest Sámi in Finland in the year 1600 CE, there would've been around 350 individuals living in pre-historic Kainuu.

== Municipalities ==
The region of Kainuu consists of two sub-regions and eight municipalities, two of which have city status (marked in bold). The administrative capital of Kainuu is Kajaani.

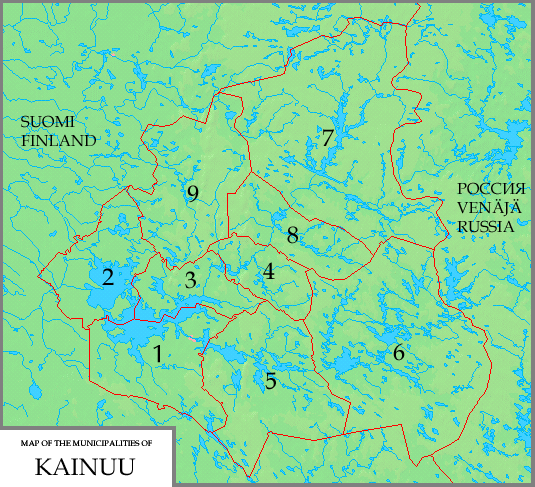
A map of Kainuu with municipalities

=== Sub-regions ===
Kajaani sub-region

- **Kajaani** (Kajana)
- Paltamo
- Ristijärvi
- Sotkamo

Kehys-Kainuu

- Hyrynsalmi
- **Kuhmo**
- Puolanka
- Suomussalmi

=== List of municipalities ===
Coat of arms	Municipality	Population	Land area (km^{2})	Density (/km^{2})	Finnish speakers	Swedish speakers	Other speakers
Coat of arms of Hyrynsalmi	Hyrynsalmi	1,984	1,421	1	98 %	0 %	2 %
Coat of arms of Kajaani	Kajaani	36,370	1,835	20	91 %	0.1 %	9 %
Coat of arms of Kuhmo	Kuhmo	7,300	4,807	2	96 %	0 %	4 %
Coat of arms of Paltamo	Paltamo	2,941	919	3	98 %	0 %	2 %
Coat of arms of Puolanka	Puolanka	2,322	2,461	1	96 %	0 %	4 %
Coat of arms of Ristijärvi	Ristijärvi	1,158	836	1	96 %	0 %	4 %
Coat of arms of Sotkamo	Sotkamo	10,161	2,649	4	95 %	0.2 %	5 %
Coat of arms of Suomussalmi	Suomussalmi	6,957	5,270	1	96 %	0 %	4 %
	Total	69,193	20,198	3	93 %	0.1 %	7 %

=== Changes in the municipalities ===
- Kajaanin maalaiskunta (merged with Kajaani in 1977)
- Säräisniemi (formed Vaala with a part of Utajärvi in 1954)
- Vuolijoki (merged with Kajaani in 2007)
- Vaala (moved to North Ostrobothnia region in 2016)

== Demographics ==
Population size 1990–2025
Year	Population
1990	92,459
1995	90,781
2000	85,736
2005	81,585
2010	78,703
2015	75,324
2020	71,664
2025	69,193

== Economy ==
In 2012, the Kainuu region had a total of 29,722 jobs. The largest sector in the employment market of Kainuu is the service sector with (21,915) 73.7% share of the regions entire employed workforce. The industrial and construction sector follow as the 2nd largest actor with (5,243) 17.6% of the employed working under these fields. Third largest sector is the forest industry and agriculture with a (2,228) 7.5% workforce. The smallest uncounted factor in these statistics are the miscellaneous jobs that do not fit easily under any of three general terms mentioned above. The miscellaneous jobs form 336 1.2% of the region's workforce.

The total unemployment of Kainuu was in 2014, 6,001 which is 16.9% of the workforce of the area. The nationwide average at the time was 12.4%. The worst unemployment was in the town of Kuhmo with (771) 19.6% people unemployed. The town with the least amount of unemployment was the municipality of Sotkamo with (684) 14.1% people unemployed. Kainuu has a total of 4,301 firms by each sector in its economy. Three of the largest sectors are Agriculture, forestry and fishing, wholesale and retail trade and construction. The smallest three are education, mining & quarrying, and information & communication.

State, municipal and private sectors are the three big players in the regions employment market. Private sector is the largest actor in the region with 51% of the workforce working on it. Municipal sector comes up to 29% and the state has 7% of the workforce. Statewide averages are 58% for the private, 23% for the municipal and 6% for the state sectors. The number of companies in the region of Kainuu is 3 429.

== Education ==
The regional education qualification level is at 67.4% between the age groups of 15 years and over. The average of women in the region for the educational qualification is 67.4% and for men 67.3%. The nationwide average is 69,4% for the whole age group and the nationwide average for women is 70.1% and for men 68.7%. Based on these numbers Kainuu has the 8th lowest educational level out of the 19 regions of Finland.

Kainuu has several further education institutes and organizations that are centralized in the town of Kajaani. These are Kajaani University of Applied Sciences, AIKOPA and Kainuu Vocational College (KAO). Many of the municipalities and towns also offer education for the upper secondary education.

Kajaani University of Applied Sciences (KAMK) offers education, research, development and innovation services. These happen in the fields of activity tourism, nursing and health care, business and innovation, information systems and mechanical engineering. The students number at 2000 in the KAMK and the staff at 235.

AIKOPA is part of KAMK's and the University of Oulu's service that is provided for joint adult and continuing education. AIKOPA offers services like education, expertise, research and development at the higher education level.

The Kainuu Vocational College (KAO) has a goal to give training, vocational and basic skills for both the young people and adults who number approximately at 2600. KAO has six different field of education through which students and the adults alike can receive qualification and training. These are technology and transportation, tourism, catering and domestic services, natural resources, healthcare, culture and business and administration.

== Transportation ==
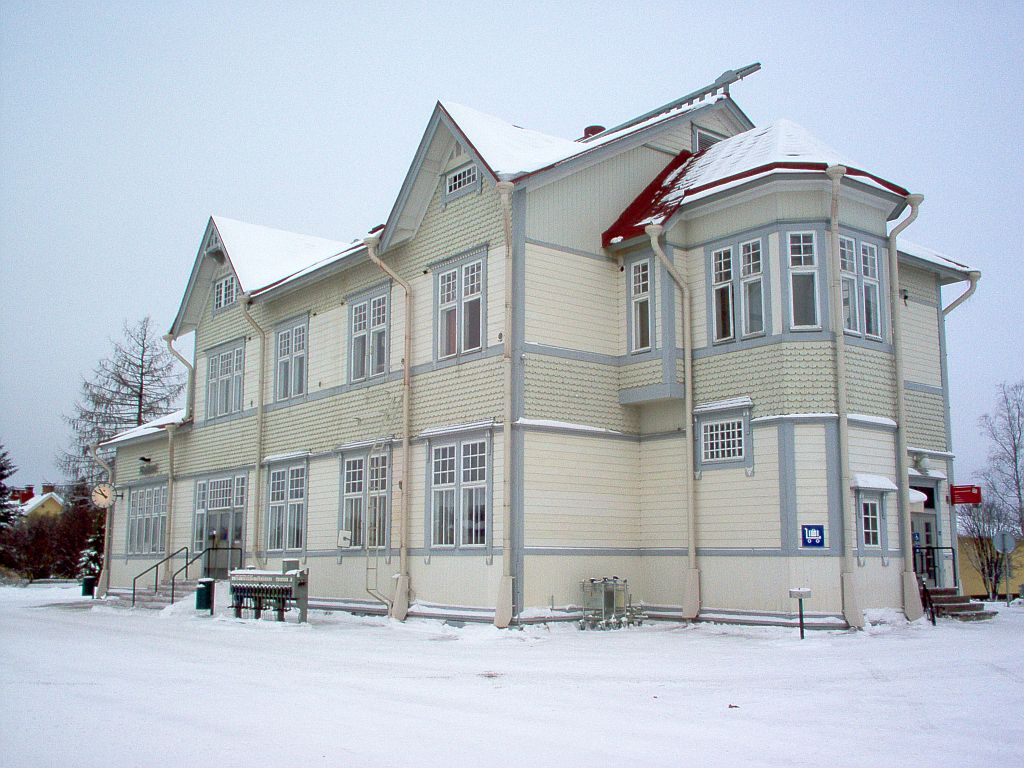
The Kajaani railway station

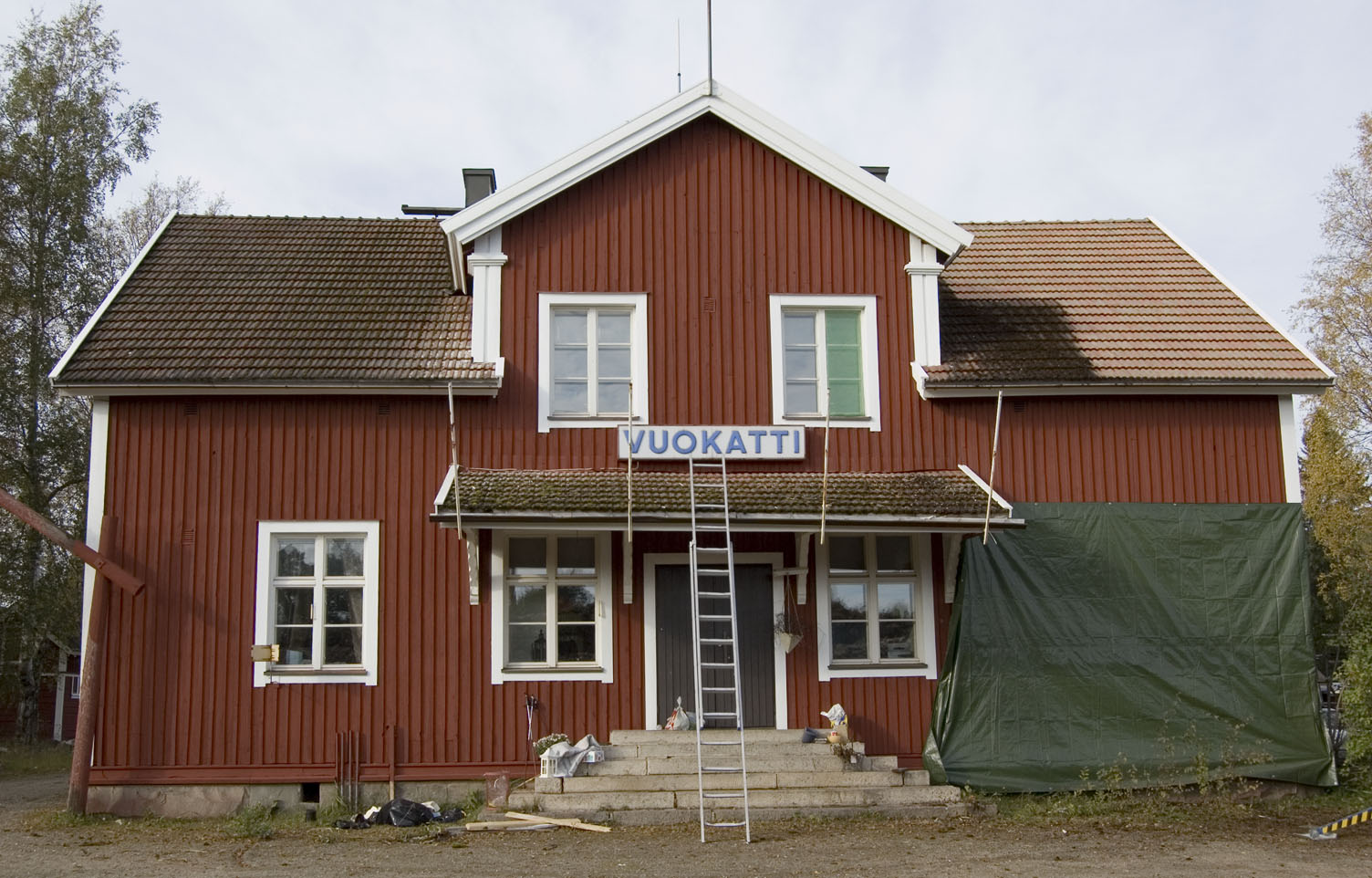
The Vuokatti railway station

Kainuu has a total of 4 732 kilometers of road network and the average of 505 private cars / 1000 inhabitants.

The air traffic of Kainuu had 81 854 cumulative passengers of which 77 981 were domestic and 3 873 were international passengers. The only major airport in the region is the Kajaani airport which is located some 7 kilometers (4 mi) northwest from the Kajaani town center.

The Kajaani railway station works as the central hub for the Kainuu regions train passenger and freight transportation. The passenger traffic from and to Kajaani railway station runs between the line 13 of Helsinki-Kajaani and the line 14A of Oulu-Kontiomäki.

== Tourism and culture ==
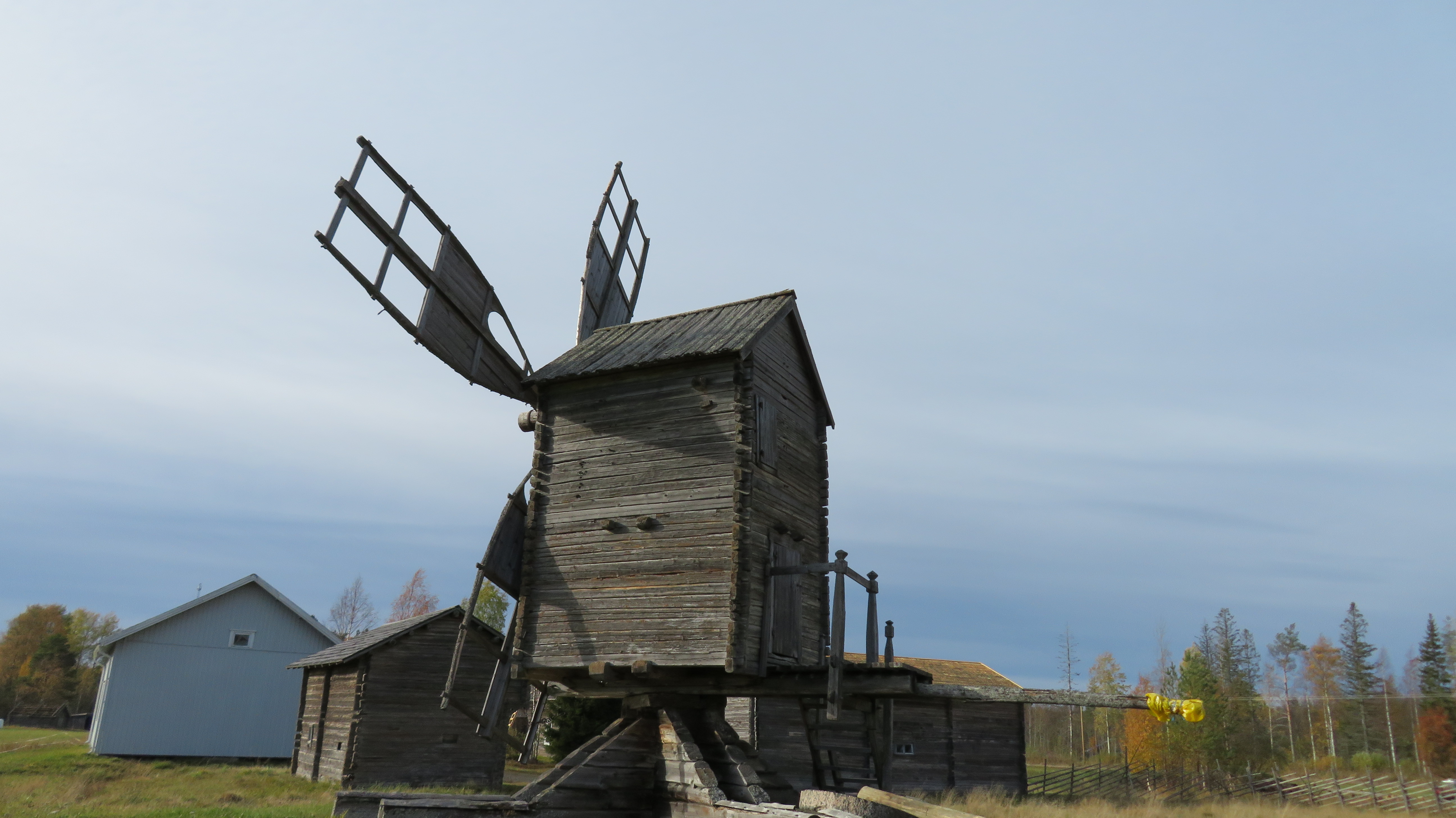
The windmill of Riihipiha in Vuolijoki

Tourism is a significant factor in the regional economics of Kainuu. The region is marketed as the Arctic Lakeland, where features of Lapland and the Finnish lake district overlap. The two most important seasons for the region's tourism are winter and summer. Winter season is the more popular one amongst the tourists and travelers, although the single most popular month for the overnight stays in Kainuu is July. The count for the nights spent in the Kainuu region was 970 953 in the year of 2014. Domestic tourism forms a major part of the annual tourism. Around 10% of the annual tourism of the regions comes from the international tourism. The variation of this number is dependent on the economic turns that have caused drops in the Russian tourism towards the Kainuu region in which the Russians have been the single largest customer group.

Kainuu region has three major sports and ski resorts, which are Paljakka, Ukkohalla and Vuokatti. These resorts offer various sport possibilities for different seasons such as skiing, downhill skiing and hiking among others.

Outside the sport resorts there are also tourism related service clusters and networks such as Wild Taiga which offers various services from different actors of Kuhmo and Suomussalmi municipalities. Other significant regional points of interest from the perspective of tourism are the areas around Oulujärvi, Kajaani and Ristijärvi.

In tourism Oulujärvi is concentrated on offering services in water and culture based tourism around the lake. Kajaani, the town on the shores of the lake, is the capital of Kainuu and the central transportational hub in the area. The town is central for the tourists who come to the Kainuu region either by train or by plane to the Kajaani Airport.

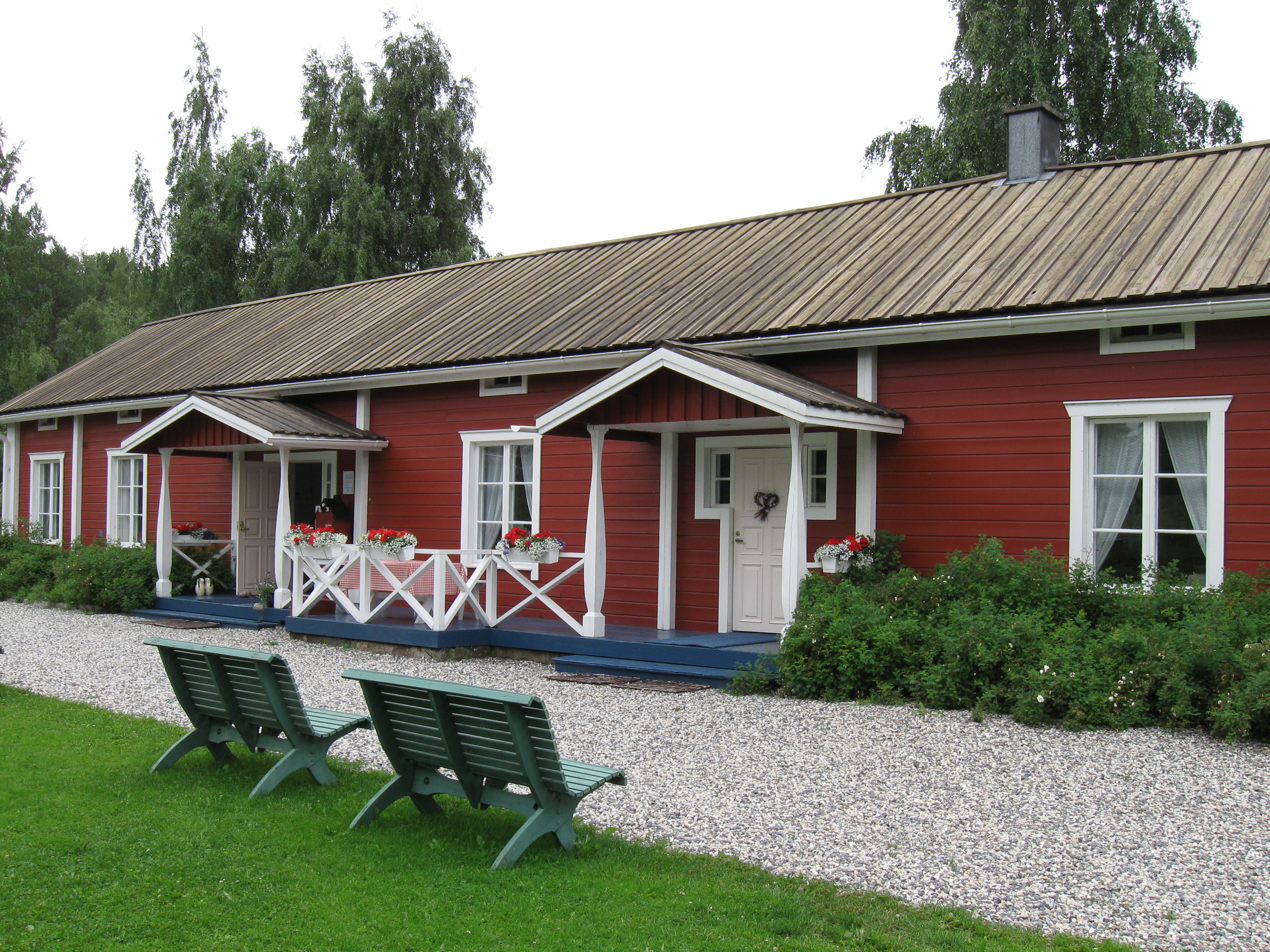
Hövelö (Eino Leino House) in Paltaniemi, Kajaani

Kajaani offers many commercial and culturally related services for tourists. The historical village of Paltaniemi in Kajaani is well known as the birthplace of the Finnish poet Eino Leino, and Elias Lönnrot lived in the same village when he compiled the Finnish national epic Kalevala. The writer Ilmari Kianto also influenced the Kainuu region, and through his works, Kianto made known the description of the Kainuu poor people at the time. Other examples of these cultural services includes the Town Theater, Kaukametsä Culture and Congress Center, Kainuu Museum and the Kajaani Art Museum and many others. Kajawood, a film production company, also known as the "Finnish Hollywood", is located in Sotkamo, Kainuu.

=== Cultural events and sightseeing ===
The region of Kainuu and its municipalities offer a wide variety of different seasonal events and sightseeing possibilities. Cultural events vary from sports to entertainment and cultural events.

- Kuhmo Chamber Music Festival
- Kajaani Poetry Week
- Kajaani Dance
- Kajaani International Dog Show
- Swamp Soccer
- Swamp Rock

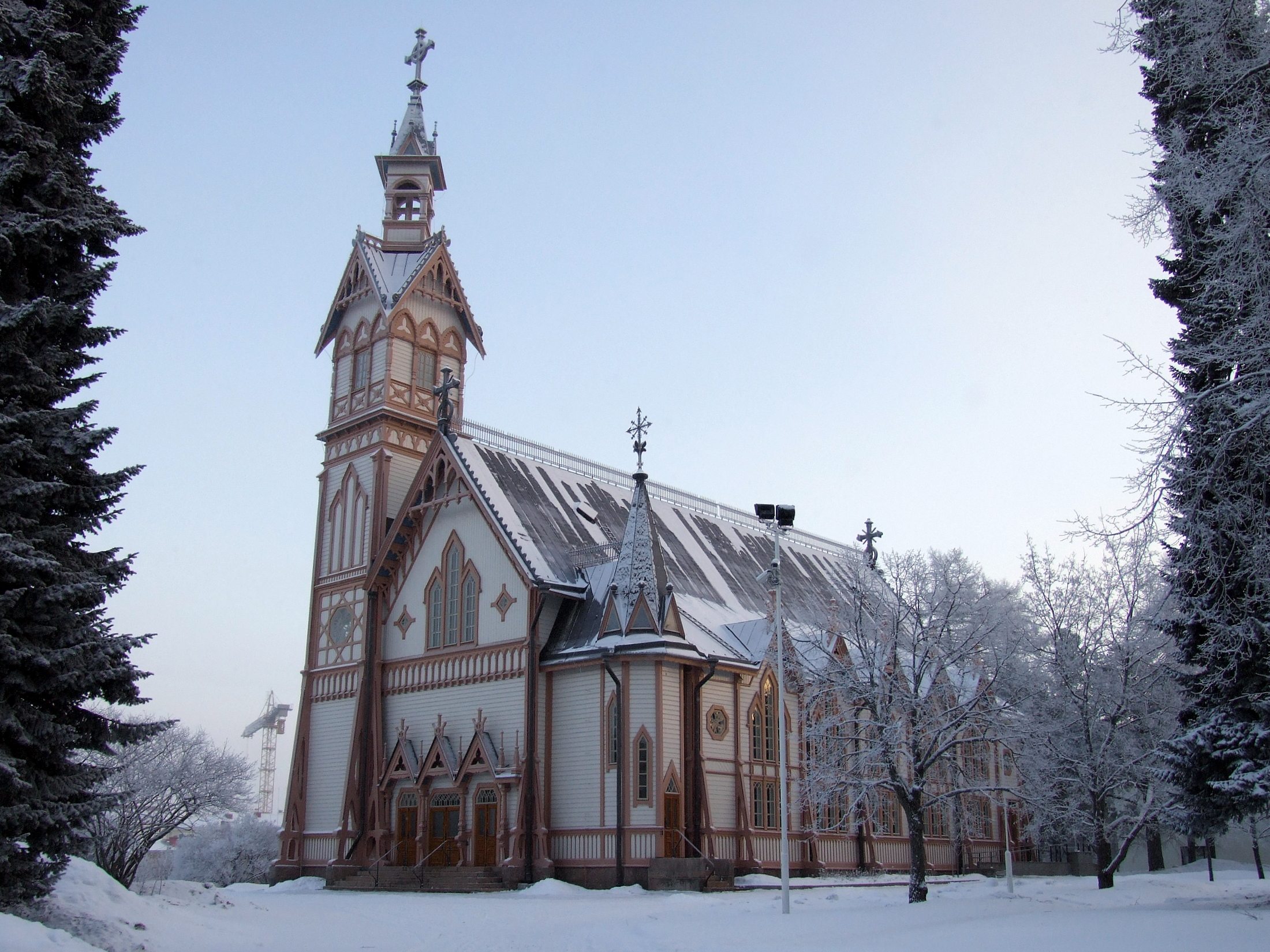
The Kajaani Church

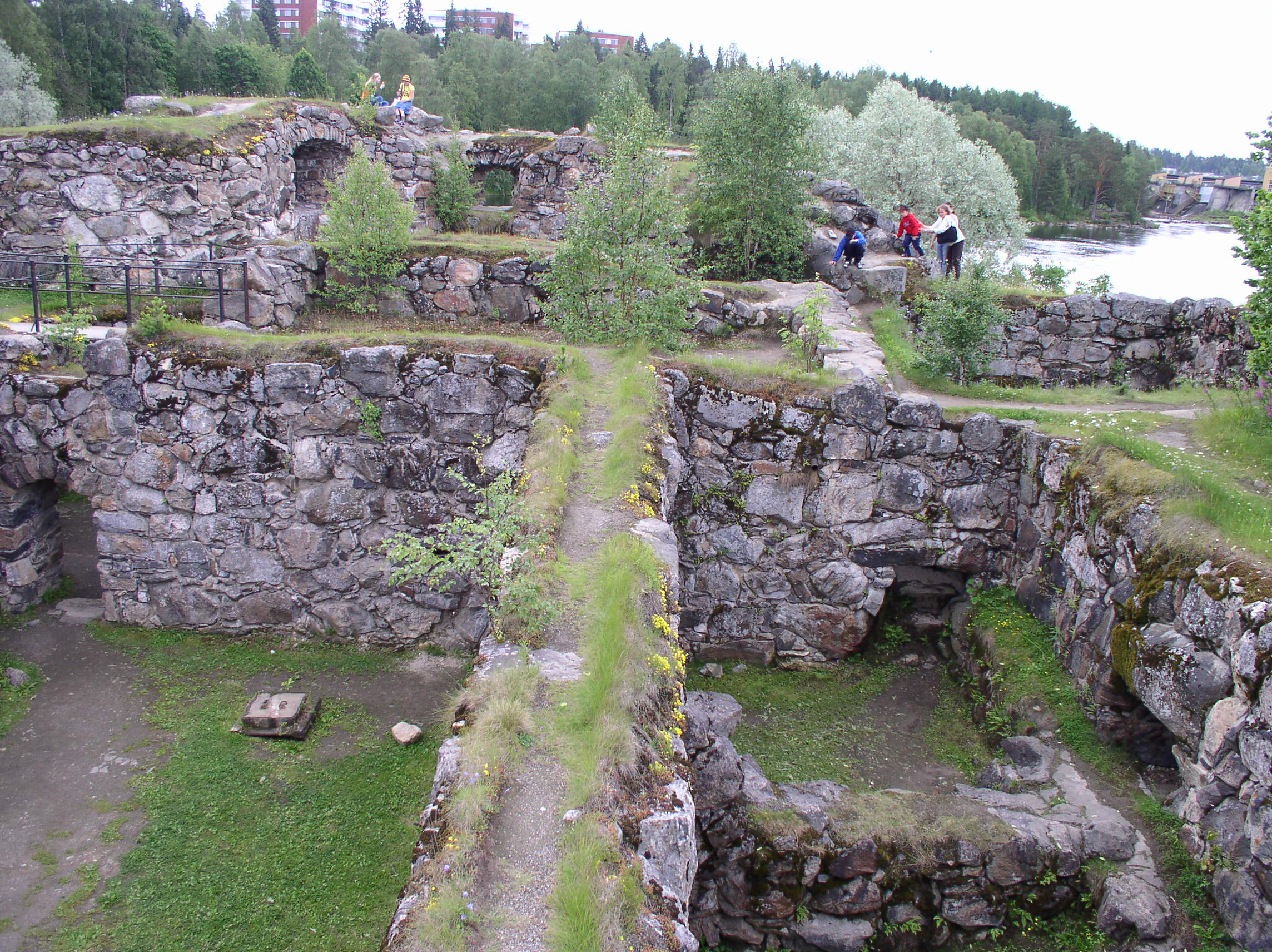
The Kajaani Castle ruins

Notable history-related sightseeing in Kainuu
- Suomussalmi Rock
- Lanka Fest
- Kainuu Orienteering Week
- Lost in Kajaani
- Kainuun Musiikki juhlat
- Ethno Music Festival Sommelo

=== History- and art-related sightseeing ===
- Eino Leino House
- Kainuu museum
- Kajaani Art Museum
- The Raatteen Portti Winter War Museum
- Winter War Museum
- Kajaani Castle
- Kajaani Church
- The Kalevala Village

=== Regional food culture ===
Food products that come from the nature are essential part of the local food culture in Kainuu. These include fish, various berries, game meat and variety of mushrooms. A few examples of these are the traditional vendace soup, smoked meat soup and the sweetened lingonberry porridge.

Bread and bakery are also one of the corner stones of Kainuu-based kitchen. These include rye bread and local specialties such as a traditional sweet delicacy called Rönttönen and the bread cheese / squeaky cheese that is often served together with cloudberry jam or as is.

== Local media ==
The Kainuu region's most popular newspaper is the morning newspaper Kainuun Sanomat with 50 000 daily readers and 16 093 copies in circulation. There are also several other smaller news- and free newspapers which are more local and town based in their news coverage and distribution. The more popular example in the Kainuu region is the Koti-Kajaani with a total of 30 276 - 38 369 copies in circulations in the weekdays of Wednesday and Saturday.

=== Local newspapers ===
- Kainuun Sanomat
- Koti-Kajaani
- Kuhmolainen
- Puolanka-lehti
- Sotkamo-lehti
- Ylä-Kainuu
- Väylä

=== Local radio stations ===
Kainuu has two regional radio stations among the statewide radio stations. Radio Kajaus bases it content on pop music, news and interviews on the current affairs. Kainuun Radio is one of the 19 regional radiostations owned by the state company Yleisradio (YLE). Between 6.30 – 17.00 the station broadcasts its own regional content. Outside of that the station will share the contents of the statewide Yle Radio Suomi station.

- Radio Kajaus
- YLE Kainuun radio

== Regional politics ==
In the Finnish parliamentary election Kainuu is part of the Oulu electoral district which elects 18 members of the Finnish parliament from the local district.

=== Parliamentary elections 2019 ===
Parliamentary elections 2019	% Of Votes Cast											
Parliamentary elections 2019	Centre Party	Finns Party	Left Alliance	SDP	National Coalition	Green League	Christian Democrats	Movement Now	Blue Reform	Seven Star Movement	Swedish People's Party	Other
Kainuu	31.28	20.42	18.54	9.57	7.75	6.23	2.20	0.40	0.38	0.21	0.08	2.94
Whole country	13.76	17.48	8.17	17.73	17.00	11.49	3.90	2.25	0.97	0.37	4.53	2.35

A municipal election is held every 4 years and the members of the elected municipal councils also elect members amongst themselves to represent their respective municipality in the regional council of Kainuu. Traditionally, up to this date, the Centre Party has been the largest political entity in both the Oulu electoral district and in the region of Kainuu.

=== Municipal elections 2012 ===
Municipal Elections 2012	Council Seats							
Municipal Elections 2012	Center Party	Left Alliance	SDP	National Coalition	Green League	Finns Party	Other	Total
Hyrynsalmi	13	5	2	0	0	0	1	21
Kajaani	13	8	7	8	1	2	9	51
Kuhmo	15	2	5	3	1	2	7	35
Paltamo	11	3	3	1	1	0	2	21
Puolanka	14	4	0	0	0	0	2	21
Ristijärvi	12	0	1	2	0	0	2	17
Sotkamo	15	6	1	4	1	0	8	35
Suomussalmi	19	10	0	2	0	0	4	35
Vaala	14	3	1	0	0	0	3	21
Kainuu in total	126	41	20	20	4	4	38	257

== Regional government and regional development ==
=== Regional Council of Kainuu ===
The Regional Council of Kainuu is one of the 19 regional councils in Finland. The law gives these councils two mains tasks that are development of the region and the land use and planning in the region. A regional council is a key actor in the area that is responsible of the implementation of the Structural Fund programs of the EU. Networking with other actors both within and outside the region is important in protecting and promoting the unique culture of the region.

Regional Council of Kainuu is governed by the regional assembly, decisions carried out by the regional board and assisted by the Regional council's office, which is led by the regional mayor. The Regional Assembly of Kainuu has 35 members. The regional council's office has about 20-25 employees and is divided into different teams depending on the area of their responsibility and expertise.

The statute of the Regional Council of Kainuu (accepted in December 2015) defines its responsibilities as follows:

- The Regional Assembly elects a council chairman and also the 1st and 2nd vice chairmen to whom the assembly also grants a right to be present and to speak at the meetings of the Board of the Regional Council.
- The Regional Assembly approves an estimated budget for the Regional Council for each financial year and a financial plan for the Regional Council at least for 3 years.
- Regional Assembly decides based on the preparations of the audit board, auditor’s report and reminders in the report on how these give rise to action. While approving the financial statement the Regional Assembly also decides on the discharge for the entities and persons accountable.
- The Regional Assembly chooses the members of the Regional Board and also chooses the chairman and the vice chairmen and decides upon the length of the term of the Regional Board.
- Regional Assembly also has the ability to establish such institutions and actors which it sees fit for the moment.
- Regional Assembly appoints an audit board for the inspection of the management and the financial situation. The Assembly also decides upon the proposal of the audit board whether there is a call for one or two auditing firm.

Source: kainuunliitto.fi

=== Areas of responsibility ===
- Land Use and Planning

Land use planning, cooperation with interest groups and other authority related tasks which are the key fields of responsibility in the regional land use planning.

The Regional land use plan is drafted by the Regional Council of Kainuu and approved by the Regional Assembly. Up until the beginning of the year 2016 the approved plan was sent to be validated at the Ministry of Environment. The changes in the legislations deemed that the need for the validation of the Ministry of Environment was no longer necessary.

From the perspective of the municipalities involved in the regional development, regional land use plan is the guide and framework that has to be taken into account when the municipalities plan or change their local master plans or local detailed plans. Regional land use plans should also be noted by the authorities of whose decision making the plans affect. The regional land use plan is a map which contains the planning entries, instructions and descriptions. These affect the contents of the land use plan, give background to the decisions made and bring forth the meaningful data about the effectiveness factors. Phased regional land use land works as supplement and provide information to the previously mentioned regional land use plan.

- Regional Development

Regional development unit is responsible for the regional development plan. This task is given by the law to the regional councils. Regional development also has the task of leading, planning and implementing both the national and EU level regional- and cohesion policymaking in the region of Kainuu. This is done in cooperation with neighboring regions. Regional development views that developing and maintaining the regions vigor is important. This relates to the work that is done on both the local, national and international level in cooperation with other actors. Cooperation and Supervision of Interests

According to 5§ of the establishing treaty of the regional council of Kainuu the mission for the council is to observe and take into account in their own work the aspects of interest driving between other actors and cooperation. In this the establishing treaty emphasizes the importance of managing the partnerships both inside the region and outside of it. The later refers to national, EU and other international level of activities. The themes for interest driving are changed depending how the situation and times dictate it and these themes and their changes can be found from the project catalog document that is kept by the regional council.

Cooperation and communication have an important role from the perspective of the interest driving. The establishing treaty notes that these two should have the role of upholding the positive image of the region of Kainuu both inside and outside of the region. An interest driving team is formed for the purpose of this role that also has members from other important actors from other organizations in addition to the regional council of Kainuu.

- Projects

According to the charter of the Regional council, one of the essential tasks of the organization is improving the wellbeing of the region's population. Among other interest driving goals, improving the living- and the business environment in the region is one of the goals of the regional development. Projects, plans and other development related-work are ways to work towards these goals with the relevant actors inside and outside of the region. The project programs and their goals are controlled to some extent by the goals set in the regional strategic programme.

For the project work, the regional council has to do tasks that relate to requisitioning, co-financing and being a partner in the projects. The project preparations are divided among the responsibilities inside the regional council teams (land use & planning, regional development etc.) depending on their field of expertise, which are, for example, in charge of the international funding of the project. In the years of the 2014–2020 EU funding is offered towards the region of Kainuu in the programs of Baltic Sea Region Programme, Northern Periphery and Arctic Programme, Interreg Europe, ENI Kolarctic and the Karelia CBC.

Other activities of the Regional Council

- Europe Direct Kainuu

The European Commission maintains an information network called the Europe Direct and one of its offices can be found from the office of regional council of Kainuu. The Europe Direct offers general information about the Europe, EU, functions and actions of the union and the funding possibilities that it offers together with the themes that the funds are emphasizing. For the information distribution the office uses social media, news letters and brochures.

=== Key strategies and documents driving the Regional Councils actions ===
- The Regional Plan of Kainuu 2035

The Kainuu Regional Plan of 2035 represents the political intentions of the region. This document has the strategies that hold inside of them the vision for the region and the politically desired outcomes for the future. The regional plan is approved by the Regional Assembly of Kainuu.

- The Regional land use plan

From the perspective of the regional planning and land use the regional land use plan is the most important document that drives their actions. The timeframe for this plan varies between 10 – 30 years and the examination for the current regional land use plan started in the year of 2014...

- Regional Programme 2014 - 2017

Regional programmes intent is to bring up ways and means through which the long timespan strategic goals of the Regional Plan 2035 can be accomplished. Strategic choices and emphasizing certain themes are ways through which the regional council aims to achieve these goals. This includes cooperation in the teams of regional development and the interest driving team and also utilizing other development actions taken by the organization.

Four emphasized themes are set for the programme of 2014 – 2017. These have themes that aim towards the development of different sectors in the society. The timeframe for each regional programme is four years.

- Implementation plan

An implementation plan is compiled out for the region of Kainuu. The time frame for this plan is two years. The function for the implementation plan is to monitor, prioritize and harmonize the region councils work together with other authorities that relate to the goals set in the regional programme. The implementation plan is an instrument to guiding projects in a way that the themes and goals of the regional programmes and the condition for the fund funding are met and achieved in these projects.

== Regional policymaking ==
=== Regional Assembly 2013–2016 ===
Representatives in the Regional Assembly	Regional Assembly of Kainuu							
Representatives in the Regional Assembly	Center Party	Left Alliance	SDP	National Coalition	Green League	Finns Party	Other	Total
Number of Assembly Representatives	14	5	4	4	1	6	1	35

The Regional Assembly of 2013-2016

- Pentti Kettunen, Chairman
- Eero Suutari, 1st Vice Chairman
- Kati Nykänen, 2nd Vice Chairman

Municipalities and towns each get certain count of representatives in the assembly. This is based on their population size. These are divided into three different categories. These numbers also include the vice representavies from each member of the assembly.

- Kajaani: 15 representatives in total.
- Kuhmo, Sotkamo and Suomussalmi: 4 representatives each.
- Hyrynsalmi, Puolanka, Paltamo and Ristijärvi 2 representavies each.

The Regional Board of 2015-2016

- Timo Korhonen, Chairman
- Eija Hakkarainen, 1st Vice Chairman
- Marisanna Jarva 2nd Vice Chairman

=== Regional Youth Council of Kainuu ===
Kainuu region also has its own Regional Youth Council, which is also the only regional level youth council in Finland. The council was formed in 2008 and it is meant to be a nonpartisan influencing group for the regions youth. Two members are selected from each municipality and town and also from the local higher education institutions – KAO & AMK.

The members of the youth council are appointed by their local municipal councils or their institutions student council. The term if two years long and during that time the youth council will also get a total of seven sponsor representatives from the Regional Assembly and the Kainuus Social and Welfare Council. The Regional Councils office will help the Youth Council with such things as setting up meetings, compile agenda for the next meeting and giving counsel and guidance on how to make meeting records, how decision making works and so forth.

Youth councils work is not defined by law, but the Regional Assembly has decided that the Youth Council should have four main tasks among more minor ones. The main tasks are:

- Youth Council will hold at least one annual Regional Youth Forum.
- Youth Council should meet both the local policymakers and parliament members.
- Youth Council will take part in the meetings of the Regional Assembly of Kainuu.
- Youth Council takes part in to the development and planning of the region’s future.

Extra duties are as follows:

- Youth council must keep an close eye on the regional developments and try to influence the decision making that affects the local youth.
- Youth Council should inspire the local youth to take part in what the societal and political activities have to offer at large.
- Youth Council should also participate in seminars, events and training and if the need arises – they should also help to organize these events.

Term for each regional youth council is two-year long. The youth council representatives will select one chairman amongst themselves who is accompanied by two vice chairmen for the two-year term. The council also selects a secretary who will cooperate together with a contact from the regional council of Kainuu who gives the necessary help, guidance and advice that the youth council secretary needs to handle their tasks.

== See also ==
- Kainuu people
- Kainuu Brigade
- Kainuu Road
- Koillismaa
- Nälkämaan laulu
- Vuolijoki
