= Masters M40 long jump world record progression =

This is the progression of world record improvements of the long jump M40 division of Masters athletics.

Key

Incomplete information Pending Indoor mark before 2000, not acceptable for record

Distance	Wind	Athlete	Nationality	Birthdate	Location	Date
7.68	1.5	Aaron Sampson	United States	20.09.1961	Cedar City	21.06.2002
7.60 i		Hans Schicker	Germany	03.10.1947	Munich	15.01.1989
7.54		Barrington Williams	United Kingdom	11.09.1955	Birmingham	01.06.1996
7.50	1.2	Tapani Taavitsainen	Finland	17.06.1944	Kajaani	07.07.1984
7.43		Tom Chilton	United States	20.04.1937		24.03.1978
7.34		Pericles Pinto	Portugal	15.02.1937	Lisbon	02.07.1977
7.13		Dave Jackson	United States	26.08.1931	Irvine	11.06.1972
6.82		Wolf Reinhardt	Germany	26.12.1928	Darmstadt	30.05.1972
