= Finnish national road 22 =

Road in Finland

National Road 22
- Valtatie 22 (Finnish); Riksväg 22 (Swedish)
- Kainuuntie ("Kainuu Road")
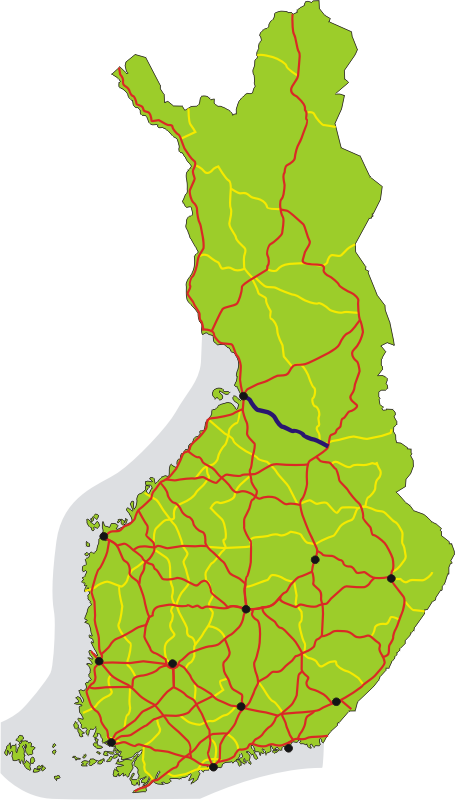

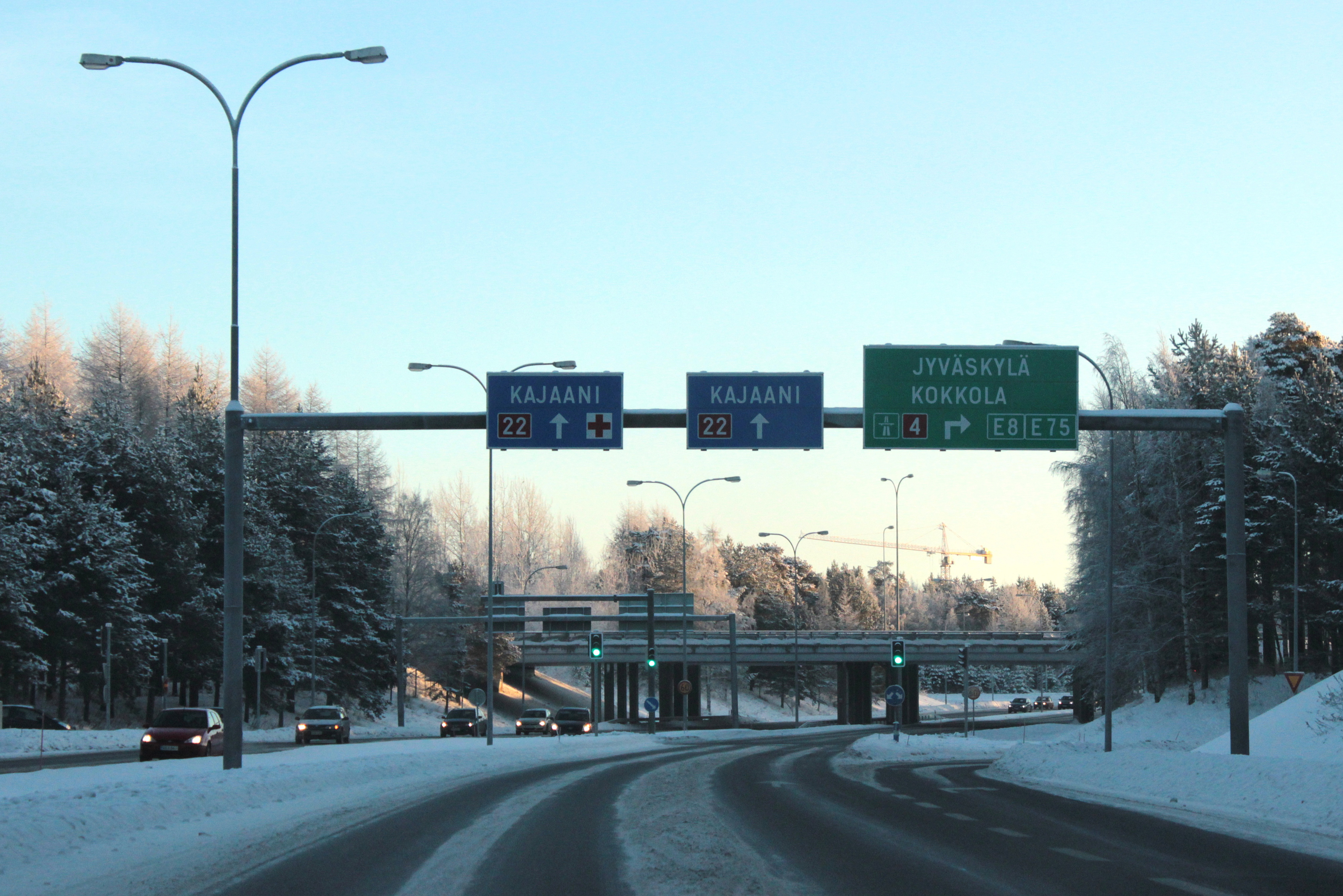

Route information
- Maintained by the Finnish Transport Agency
- Length: 185 km (115 mi)
- Existed: 1976–present

Major junctions
- From: Oulu
- To: Kajaani

Location
- Country: Finland

Highway system
- Highways in Finland
| ← Vt 21 | → Vt 23 |

The Finnish national road 22 (Finnish: Valtatie 22; Swedish: Riksväg 22; also known as Kainuuntie, "Kainuu Road") is the main route between the major cities of Oulu and Kajaani in northern Finland. The road is 185 kilometres (115 mi) long, and it is part of the national transport route network that connects two regions, North Ostrobothnia and Kainuu. At the Oulu end, the road connects to Highway 4 (E8/E75), while at the Kajaani end, it connects to Highway 5 (E63).

The Finnish Transport Agency improved the entrance section of Highway 22 in Oulu between Joutsentie and Konttisentie, with the aim of increasing traffic flow and safety. In this contract, the section of Highway 22 between Joutsentie and Haarankangas was widened into a four-lane median road and the section between Haarankangas and Sääskensuontie was improved to a two-lane median road. From the direction of Kajaani, the lane arrangements of Highways 5 and Highway 6, i.e. the Sotkamontie multi-level interchange, were improved. In addition, two bypasses were built on Highway 5 at Häikiönmäentie and Pöyhölänniementie. Construction started at the end of 2015, but most of the contract work was carried out in 2016 and 2017. The total cost of the project was €16,200,000, of which the Finnish Transport Agency accounted for €15,000,000. Oulu, Muhos and Utajärvi contributed to the costs of the project with a total of €1,200,000.

== History ==
In the 1938 numbering system, the route between Oulu and Kajaani was main road 77. At the time, the road mainly ran south of the Oulu River. In the 1950s, a new road was built north of the river, and main road 77 was rerouted onto it. The southern road was improved in the 1960s and 1970s, and main road 77 was rerouted back to the southern road in 1973. After this alignment, the route was redesignated as national road 22 in 1976, and main road 77 was discontinued. The northern road later became regional road 830 and is now connecting road 8300. The main road 77 designation has since been used elsewhere.

== Route ==
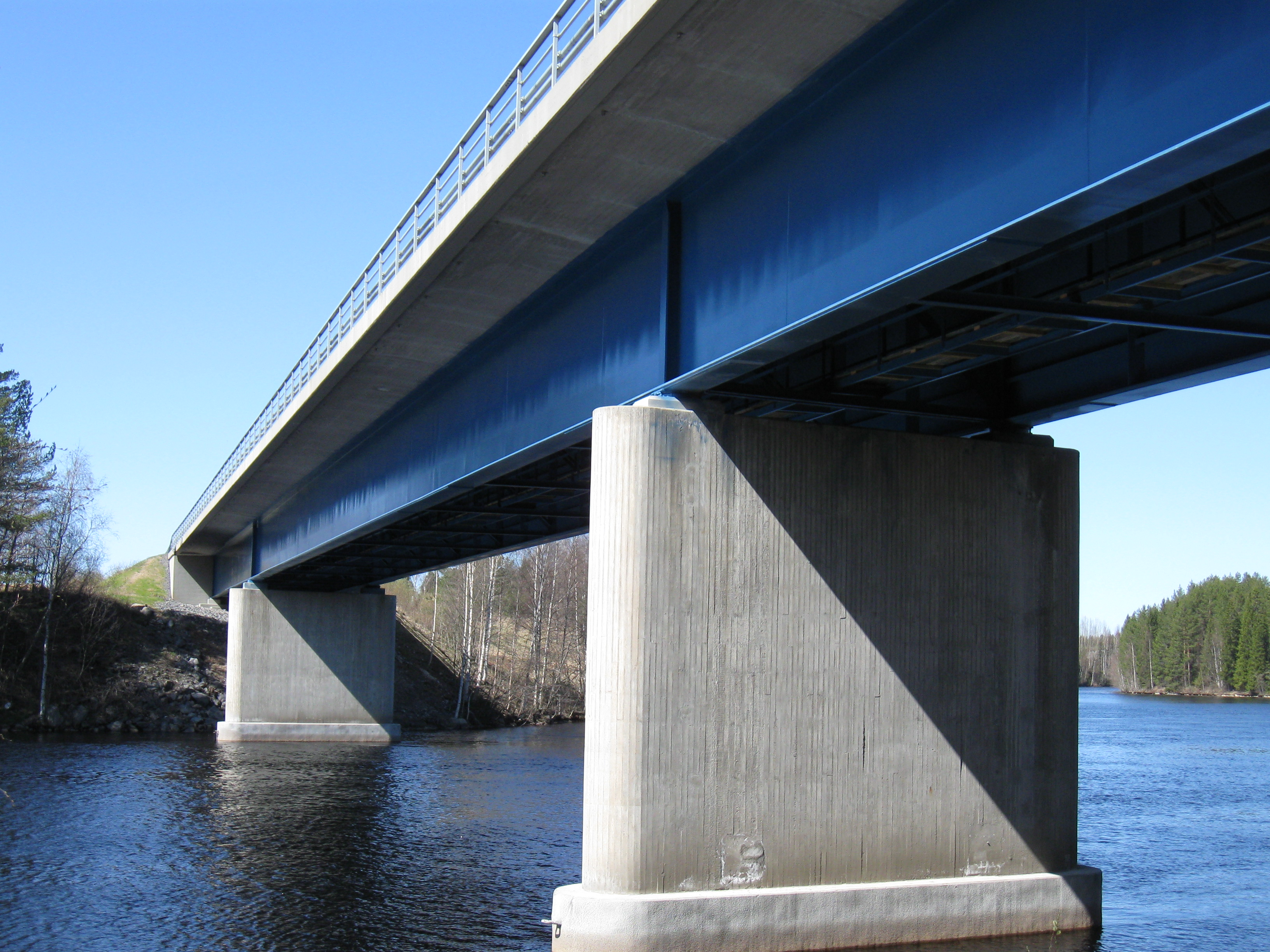
The Ahmaskoski Bridge on Highway 22 across the Oulu River in Utajärvi

The road passes through the following municipalities:
Oulu – Muhos – Utajärvi – Vaala – Paltamo – Kajaani
