= Kajaani University of Applied Sciences =

Institute of higher education in Kajaani, Finland

- Kajaanin ammattikorkeakoulu
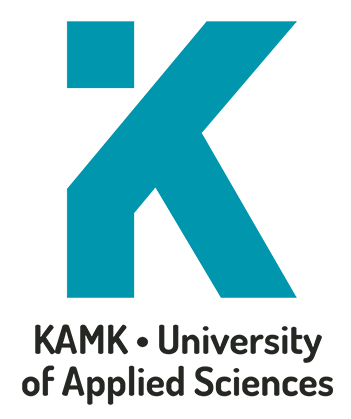
- Type: University of applied sciences (polytechnic)
- Established: 1992
- Rector: Matti Sarén (2018)
- Students: 1,957 (2010)
- Location: Kajaani, Kainuu, Finland; 64°12′57″N 27°42′34″E
- Website: www.kamk.fi

Kajaani University of Applied Sciences (KAMK, in Finnish: Kajaanin ammattikorkeakoulu) is a university of applied sciences located in the town of Kajaani. There are approximately 2200 students and 230 members of staff at KAMK. Kajaani University of Applied Sciences has achieved success nationally in Ministry of Education and Culture outcome barometers where the quality of teaching and counselling has been considered the best in Finland for several years running. In addition, based on student feedback, the student satisfaction was the highest in Finland at KAMK in 2019. The Finnish Education Evaluation Centre (FINEEC) has awarded KAMK a quality label which is valid until 20 March 2021. On Kajaani University of Applied Sciences' integrated campus area all student services are close to each other.

Organisational structure of KAMK:

- School of Business (Tourism, Sports, Business)
- School of Engineering (Information Systems, Mechanical and Mining Engineering)
- School of Health (Nursing, Healthcare and Social Services)

KAMK offers both Bachelor's and Master's degrees delivered in Finnish and four Bachelor's degrees and one Master's degree delivered in English.

The extent of studies in a university of applied sciences is 210 - 240 credits (ECTS), which means 3,5 – 4 years of studies. An essential part of studies is practical training worth 30 credits (ECTS). Internationality is emphasized in all education offered at Kajaani University of Applied Sciences. It is possible to complete part of the studies and the practical training also abroad using the worldwide network of partners. KAMK also offers double degree programmes, giving the students an opportunity to finish their studies with two bachelor's degrees.

== Studies Offered in English ==
The english-taught Bachelor's studies take approximately 3,5 years to finish. The Master's degree is a part-time degree, and it takes approximately two years to complete the degree. There are tuition fees for non-EU-students. The main application period for studies starting in autumn, is in January yearly.

== International Research, Development and Innovation Sector ==
Kajaani University of Applied Sciences' research, development and innovation work supports enterprises and business life locally, nationally and, on its field of focus, also internationally. In R&D, KAMK focuses on the needs of the labor markets through higher education development projects. Most of the projects are collaborative undertakings with private companies, education institutions, governmental and non-governmental organizations and other bodies.

CEMIS, the Centre for Measurement and Information Systems, is a contract-based joint centre of two universities (Oulu and Jyväskylä), KAMK, VTT Technical Research Centre of Finland Ltd. and CSC - IT Centre for Science Ltd.
