= Kajaani =

Town in Kainuu, Finland

Kajaani Kajana
- Town
- Kajaanin kaupunki Kajana stad
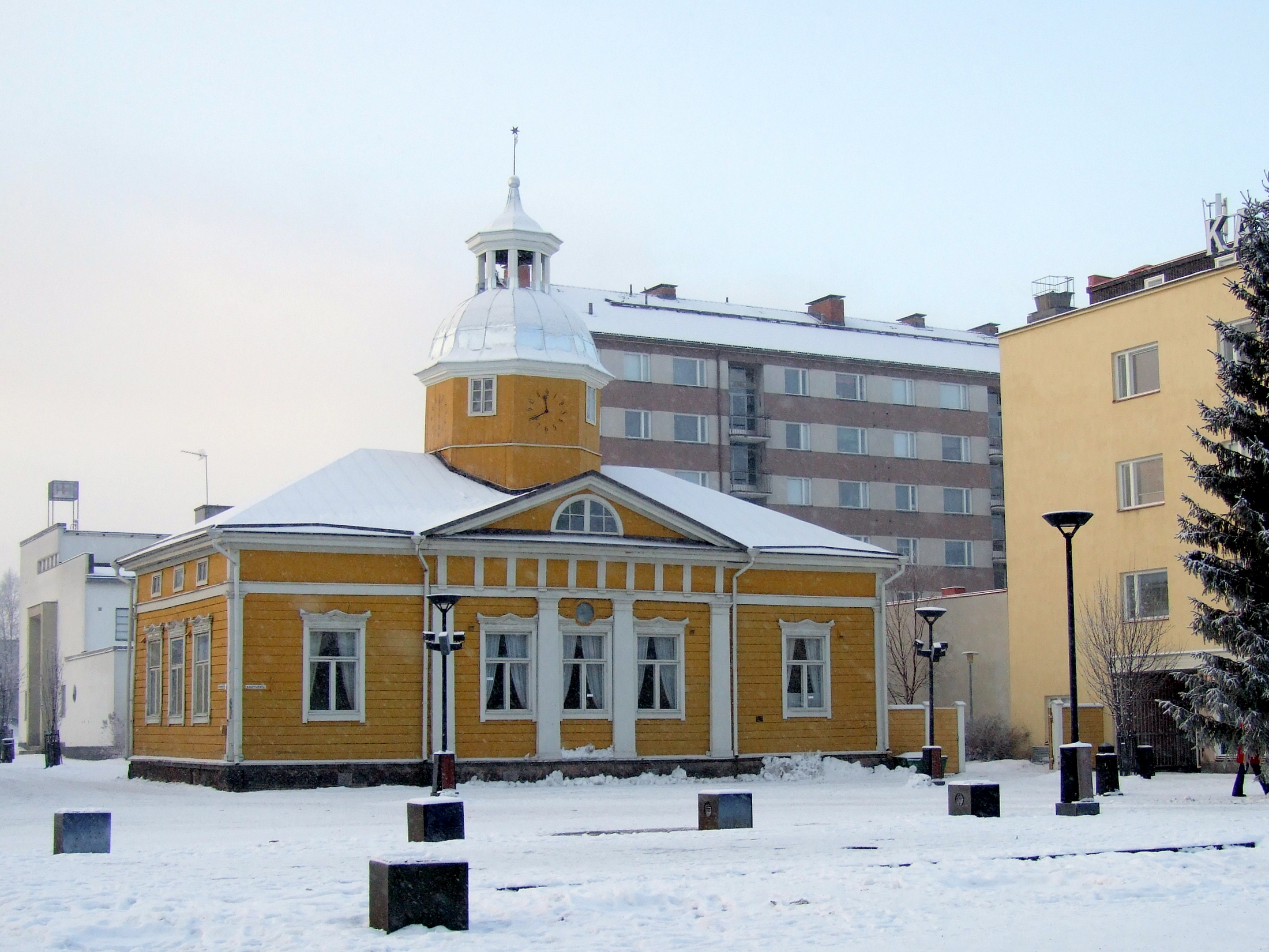
- The old Town hall

- Coat of arms

- Location of Kajaani in Finland
- Interactive map of Kajaani
- Coordinates: 64°13.5′N 027°44′E
- Country: Finland
- Region: Kainuu
- Sub-region: Kajaani
- Charter: March 6, 1651; 375 years ago

Government
  - Mayor: Jari Tolonen

Area (2018-01-01)
  - Total: 2,263.99 km^{2} (874.13 sq mi)
  - Land: 1,834.83 km^{2} (708.43 sq mi)
  - Water: 428.94 km^{2} (165.61 sq mi)
  - Rank: 33rd largest in Finland

Population (2025-12-31)
  - Total: 36,370
  - Rank: 32nd largest in Finland
  - Density: 19.82/km^{2} (51.3/sq mi)
- Demonym: kajaanilainen (Finnish)

Population by native language
  - Finnish: 91.1% (official)
  - Swedish: 0.1%
  - Others: 8.8%

Population by age
  - 0 to 14: 15.6%
  - 15 to 64: 60.4%
  - 65 or older: 24%
- Time zone: UTC+02:00 (EET)
  - Summer (DST): UTC+03:00 (EEST)
- Website: Official website

Kajaani (Finnish: [ˈkɑjɑːni]; Swedish: Kajana) is a town in Finland and the regional capital of Kainuu. Kajaani is located southeast of Lake Oulu, which drains into the Gulf of Bothnia through the Oulu River. The population of Kajaani is approximately 36,000, while the sub-region has a population of approximately 51,000. It is the 32nd most populous municipality in Finland.

The town was founded in the 17th century, fueled by the growth of the tar industry, but it was preceded by a long history of settlements. During the Great Northern War it succumbed to Russian forces, who ruined Kajaani Castle in 1716. Today, the local economy is mainly driven by the sawmill, lumber, and paper industries, although UPM Kymmene's paper mill, the main employer from 1907 until 2008, has since closed. Kajaani's church was built in 1896 in the Neo-Gothic style by the architect Jac Ahrenberg to replace an earlier church. Kajaani's town theatre was established in 1969.

Kajaani is home to two football clubs, AC Kajaani and Kajaanin Haka, and the ice hockey team Hokki. The Kajaani University of Applied Sciences was established in 1992. Kajaani is also home to LUMI, the "fastest supercomputer in the EU", which is located on the former paper mill site of UPM. Also, Google is planning a data center to be located in the village of Otanmäki, which is situated approximately 37 kilometres (23 mi) from the town center.

== History ==
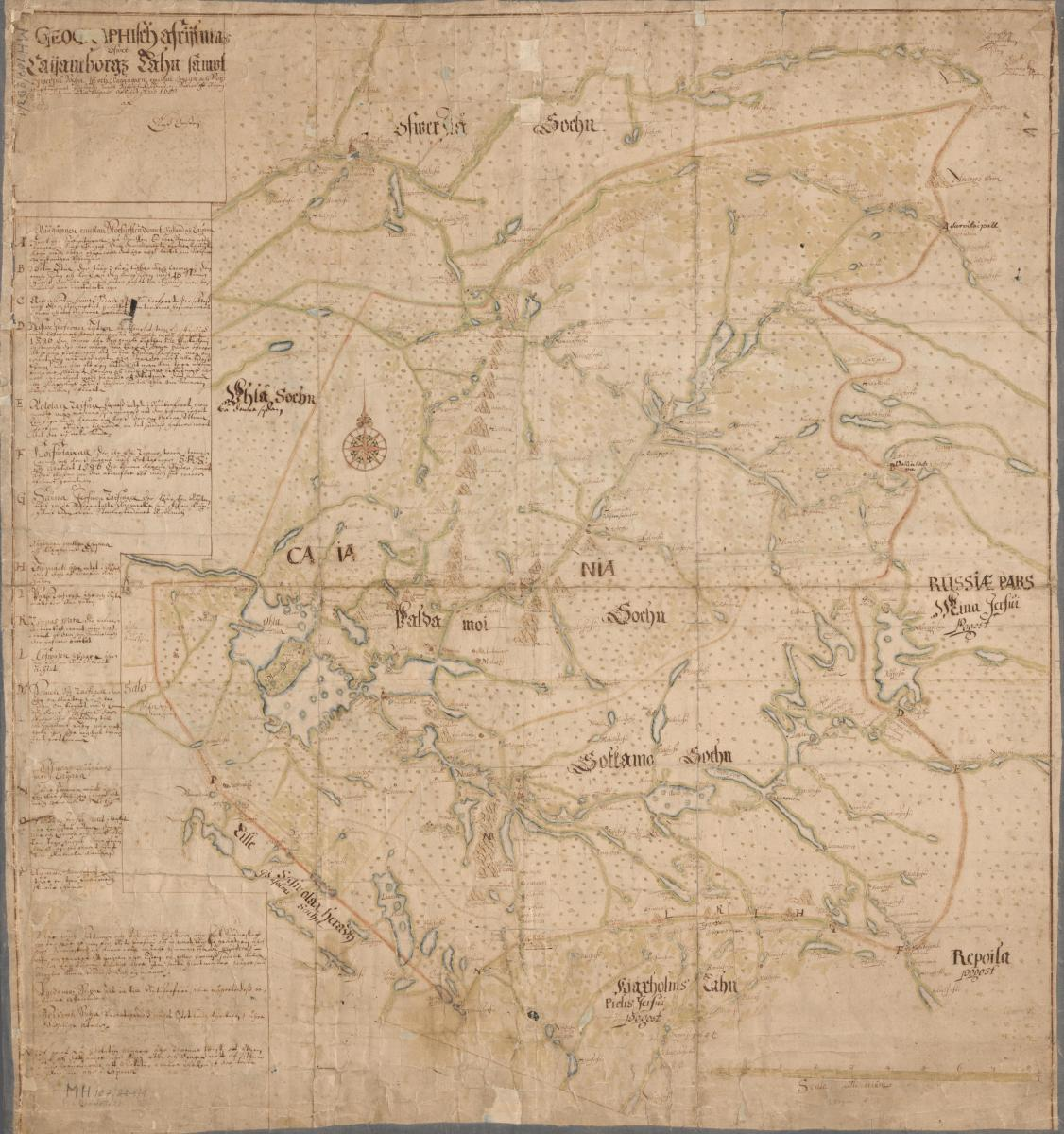
Map of Kajaani Province from 1650

Kajaani was one of the cities founded on 6 March 1651 by the Swedish Governor General of Finland, Per Brahe. At that time, the Kainuu region—as wood country—was an important producer of tar derived from pine, and the tar trade was its major industry. In 1653–4 the district court sessions of Kajaani and Sotkamo were responsible for authorizing a road to be built between Säräisniemi and Raahe, improving communications in the region.

During the Greater Wrath in the 18th century, Kajaani Castle was forced to surrender to Russian forces. The Russians blew the castle up in March 1716, and it has been in ruins ever since. On 17 October 1808, General Johan August Sandels won a key victory to the south of Kajaani near Iisalmi during the Battle of Koljonvirta of the Finnish War, when his army of just 1,800 defeated over 6,000 Russians. There is a monument on the east side of the river marking where the spot where Lieutenant Jakob Henrik Zidén and Major-General Mikhail Petrovich Dolgorukov fell.

In early 1833, medical doctor Elias Lönnrot, best known for compiling the Kalevala, the national epic of Finland, was appointed district physician in Kajaani and was assigned to assist in dealing with the typhoid and cholera epidemic which was raging during the 1830s. The disease was difficult to treat and he soon fell ill himself with typhus at the end of February 1833 but recovered. Kajaani was severely affected by the famine in 1867–1868 which devastated much of Finland, but the town gradually recovered and by the end of the century had grown to more than 1200 inhabitants. Kajaani Town Hall was built in 1831, the former City Library in 1830, Kainuu's first elementary school in 1883, and Kajaani Church in 1896 as it grew into a notable settlement.

The paper industry took off in Kajaani in the early 20th century in particular. Kajaani Paper Mill was built in 1907 and was run by the firm Kajaani Oy, which had a capital of FMK 5,000,000 (£137,615) in 1948. Kajaani Oy was eventually acquired by Valmet in 1983, and the subsidiary Kajaani Electronics was formed. Ämmäkoski power plant was built on the river in 1917 by the Kajaani Lumber Company, and underwent alterations under architect Eino Pitkänen in the 1940s.

The city's grew in the 1960s to 14,600 inhabitants. Industrial development in the 1970s, and the merger of the separate rural municipality of Kajaani, Kajaanin maalaiskunta, and the city in 1977 saw the population jump to 34,574 by 1980. Vuolijoki was consolidated with Kajaani at the beginning of 2007.

In 2012, an oil spill occurred in Kajaani. 110,000 liters of oily water leaked into a river that eventually flowed into the Oulujärvi lake.

== Geography ==
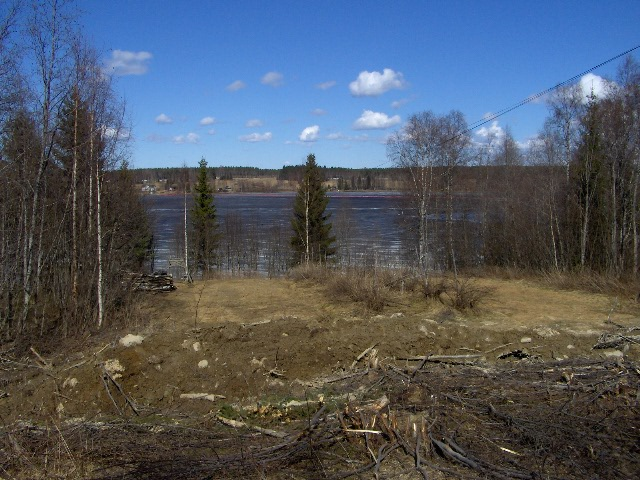
Jormuanlahti Bay, Kajaani

Kajaani is situated in the heart of central Finland. By road is it 558 kilometres (347 mi) north-northwest of Helsinki, 170 kilometres (110 mi) north of Kuopio, and 182 kilometres (113 mi) southeast of Oulu. Villages in the vicinity include Jormua, Koutaniemi, Kuluntalahti, Lahnasjärvi, Lehtovaara, Linnantaus, Mainua, Murtomäki and Paltaniemi. Districts of Kajaani include: Heinisuo, Hetteenmäki, Hoikankangas, Huuhkajanvaara, Katiska, Kettu, Komiaho, Kuurna, Kylmä, Kättö, Kätönlahti, Laajankangas, Lehtikangas, Lohtaja, Nakertaja, Onnela, Palokangas, Petäisenniska, Puistola, Purola, Soidinsuo, Suvantola, Teppana, Tihisenniemi, Tikkapuro, Variskangas and Yläkaupunki.

Kajaani lies on the Kajaani River, between the lakes of Oulujärvi, which drains to the Gulf of Bothnia along the Oulu River, and Nuasjärvi. Between Kajaani and Oulujärvi are the smaller lakes of Sokajärvi and Paltajärvi, which are frozen during winter. Paltajärvi stands between the Kajaani River and Oulujärvi. The Kajaani and Vuolijoki rivers are noted for their fishing. The island of Käkisaari lies on lake Oulujärvi to the northwest of the town and features residential houses and about 150 summer cottages and holiday apartments, and the island of Toukka lies in the eastern part of the lake. Also within the municipality is the 34.7 square kilometres (13.4 sq mi) Laakajärvi, a lake with a maximum depth of 25 metres (82 ft), which is a notable nesting area for Great black-backed gull and ospreys.

The surrounding area is dominated by mainly conifer forest, with broad-leafed birch and alder woods on some of the steeper banks and streams. An early 20th century analysis of vegetation cover in Kajaani county recorded 385 different species of vascular plants. Talaskangas Nature Reserve, with nearly pristine natural forest and about 50 different wildlife species, is in the Vieremä and Sonkajärvi local area. Logging was planned in the 1980s, but environmental activists prevented exploitation through lobbying. The reserve was formally established in 1994.

=== Climate ===
Kajaani lies within the subarctic climate zone (Köppen: Dfc), but the proximity of the Baltic Sea and warm airflows from the Atlantic Ocean (as well as warm current) result in a much milder climate than many locations at this latitude. Summers are cool, with the hottest month usually in July, with the average high temperature reaching 20 °C (68 °F), although during severe heatwaves highs of 31 °C (88 °F) have been reached in July and August and a local record of 34.5 °C (94.1 °F), was registered in July during the heatwave of 2010. The summers also have the most rainfall, reaching a peak in July with 99 mm (4 in). Rainfall is fairly constant throughout the year, with no dry season. Winters can be harsh, and temperatures can drop below −30 °C (−22 °F). The peak of the cold season on average lasts from December 11 to March 8, with an average daily high temperature below −3 °C (27 °F), with the greatest snowfall in January.

Climate data for Kajaani (1991-2020 normals, extremes 1959-present from Lentoasema and Petäisenniska, sunshine 1961-1990)
Month	Jan	Feb	Mar	Apr	May	Jun	Jul	Aug	Sep	Oct	Nov	Dec	Year
Record high °C (°F)	8.7 (47.7)	7.0 (44.6)	13.0 (55.4)	20.6 (69.1)	28.6 (83.5)	31.3 (88.3)	34.5 (94.1)	30.7 (87.3)	25.1 (77.2)	19.8 (67.6)	10.5 (50.9)	7.3 (45.1)	34.5 (94.1)
Mean daily maximum °C (°F)	−6.3 (20.7)	−6.0 (21.2)	−0.9 (30.4)	5.5 (41.9)	12.7 (54.9)	17.9 (64.2)	20.9 (69.6)	18.3 (64.9)	12.5 (54.5)	5.0 (41.0)	−0.4 (31.3)	−3.8 (25.2)	6.3 (43.3)
Daily mean °C (°F)	−9.5 (14.9)	−9.7 (14.5)	−5.0 (23.0)	1.2 (34.2)	7.8 (46.0)	13.4 (56.1)	16.2 (61.2)	14.0 (57.2)	8.9 (48.0)	2.8 (37.0)	−2.4 (27.7)	−6.4 (20.5)	2.6 (36.7)
Mean daily minimum °C (°F)	−13.7 (7.3)	−14.3 (6.3)	−10.0 (14.0)	−3.6 (25.5)	2.1 (35.8)	7.9 (46.2)	11.1 (52.0)	9.4 (48.9)	5.1 (41.2)	0.1 (32.2)	−5.3 (22.5)	−10.2 (13.6)	−1.8 (28.8)
Record low °C (°F)	−42.0 (−43.6)	−42.8 (−45.0)	−35.5 (−31.9)	−24.7 (−12.5)	−10.7 (12.7)	−4.3 (24.3)	−0.1 (31.8)	−3.5 (25.7)	−10.5 (13.1)	−22.9 (−9.2)	−34.3 (−29.7)	−40.4 (−40.7)	−42.8 (−45.0)
Average precipitation mm (inches)	37 (1.5)	34 (1.3)	31 (1.2)	30 (1.2)	56 (2.2)	78 (3.1)	99 (3.9)	84 (3.3)	54 (2.1)	53 (2.1)	45 (1.8)	43 (1.7)	644 (25.4)
Mean monthly sunshine hours	17.3	58.9	128.5	181.7	251.4	262.5	266.5	195.1	111.7	56.1	18.0	5.3	1,553
Source 1: FMI
Source 2: NOAA

== Demographics ==
As of 31 December 2025, the municipality has a population of 36,370 (around 34,000 in the town itself) and covers an area of 2,263.99 square kilometres (874.13 sq mi) of which 428.94 km^{2} (165.61 sq mi) is water. The population density is 19.82 inhabitants per square kilometre (51.3/sq mi).

The municipality is unilingually Finnish (only 0.09% of people from Kajaani speak Swedish as their first language).

Population size 1990–2025
Year	Population
1990	39,577
1995	39,827
2000	38,912
2005	38,217
2010	38,157
2015	37,622
2020	36,567
2025	36,370

== Government ==
The Kajaani City Council consists of 51 members and following the 2021 municipal elections the seats are divided for the Centre Party (12), the Finns Party (11), the Left Alliance (9), the National Coalition Party (8), the Social Democratic Party (6), the Green League (4) and the Christian Democrats (1). The chairperson of the City Council is Eila Aavakare from the Finns Party. The 11-member City Government is headed by Teuvo Hatva. The Mayor, whose duty is that of a civil servant independent of the city council, is Jari Tolonen.

== Economy ==
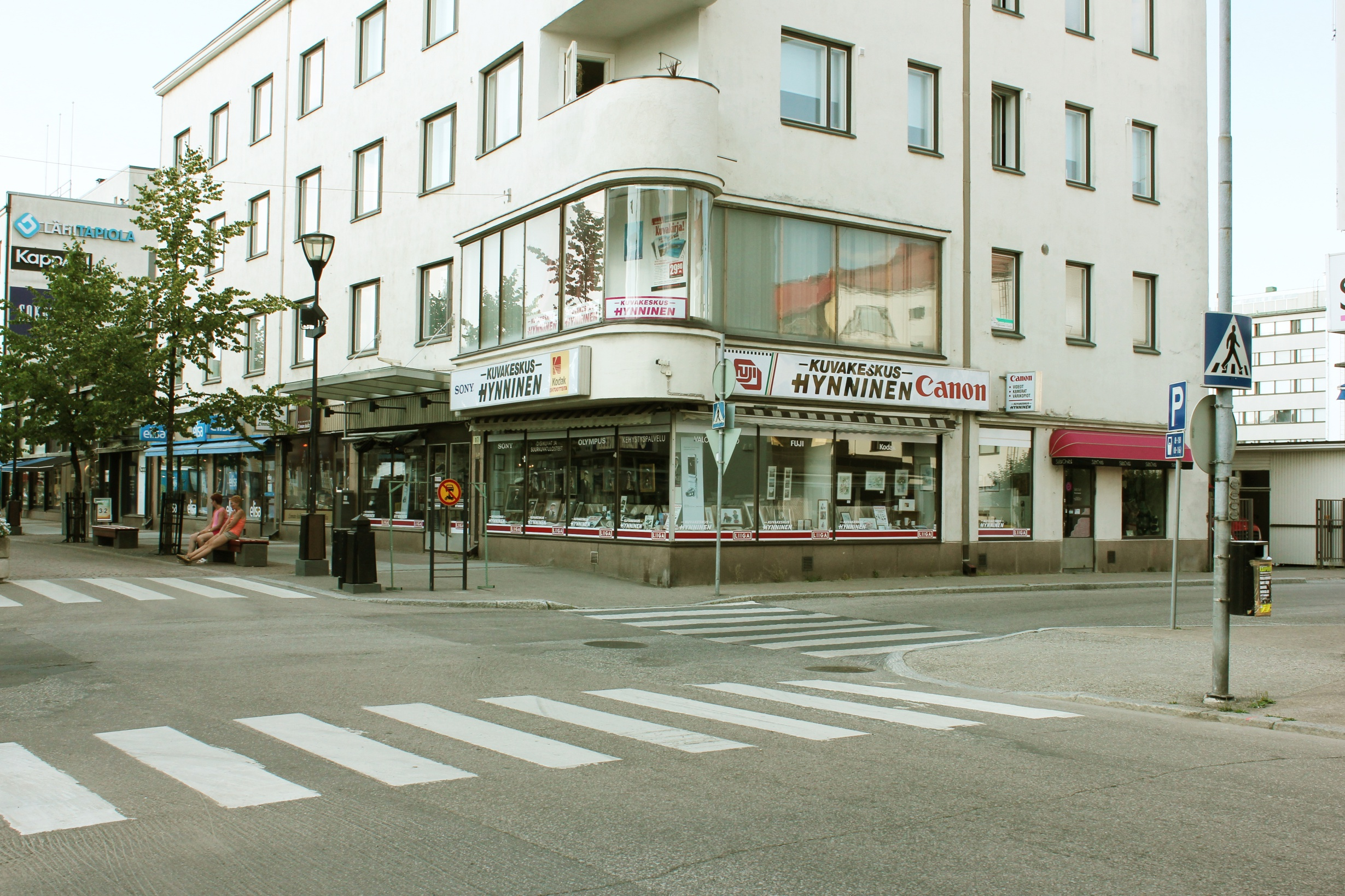
The corner of Kauppakatu and Kirkkokatu

The budgeted income of Kajaani was FIM 930 million in 1996. In its earlier history, Kajaani was a thriving center of the tar industry. A channel built in 1846 especially for the transportation of tar out of the town still exists today.

Today the local economy is driven by mainly the sawmill, lumber and paper industries. Kajaani paper mill, established in 1907 by Kajaani Oy (ex Kajaanin Puutavara Osakeyhtio), was the largest private employer in Kajaani. The factories are on the river bank, at Tihisenniemi. They built a new paper machine in the town in 1980 which was projected to have an annual output of 170,000 tons. Kajaani Oy was eventually acquired by Valmet in 1983, and the subsidiary Kajaani Electronics was formed. Kajaani Electronics was cited as "one of the leading makers of special sensors and analyzers for the pulp and paper industry" in 1990. When the paper mill was acquired by UPM Kymmene in 1989 it became the third-largest paper company in Finland. It closed in 2008 due to lack of profitability and high energy costs, but has since continued its operations, and was sold to Pölkky Oy in 2012.

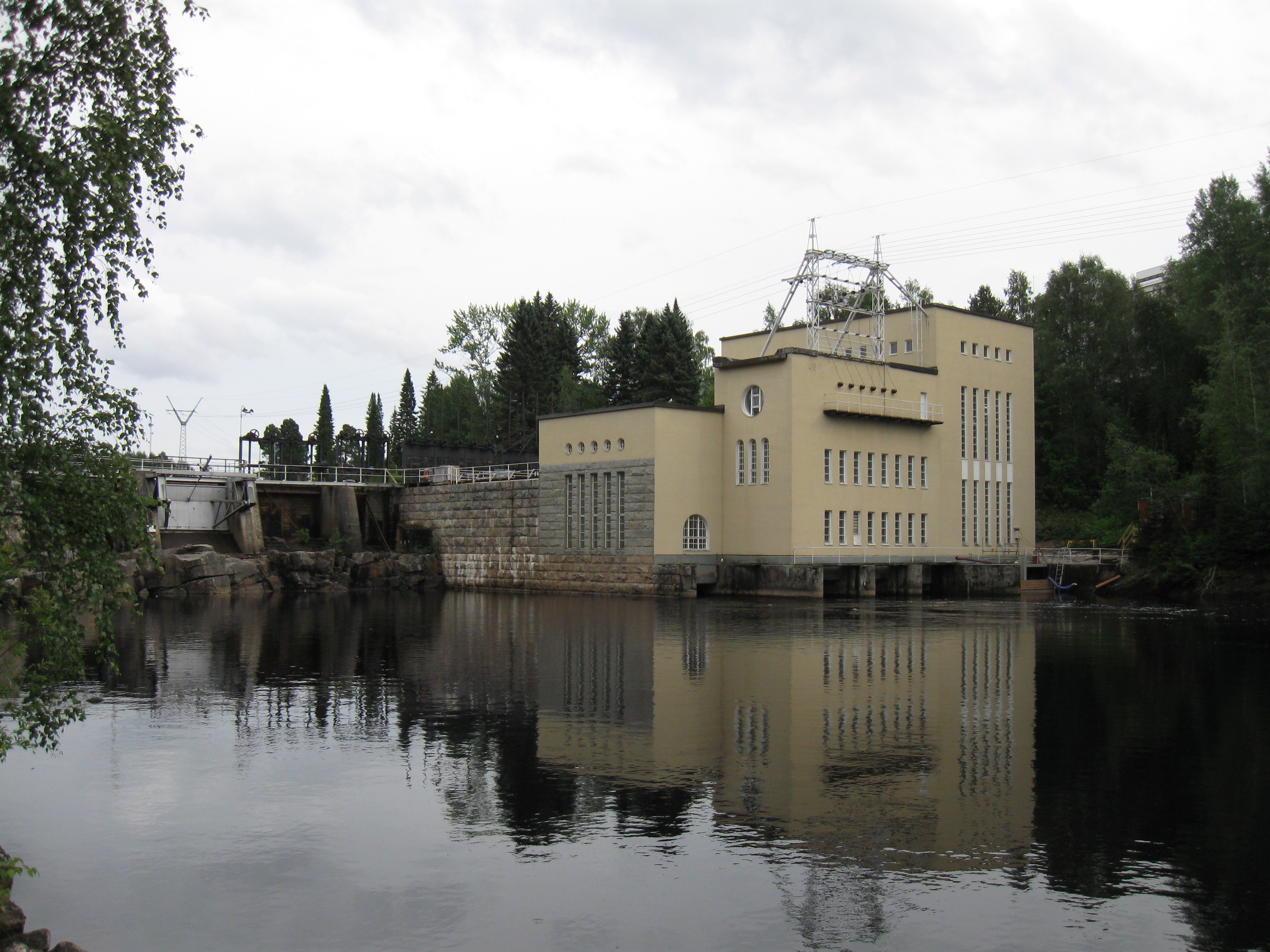
Ämmäkoski power plant on the river

In the early 1970s an electronics manufacturing plant was built in Kajaani, and the firm Kajaani Automation was established in 1980. As of 1999 the peat industry in Kajaani earned FIM 0.5 million annually. Some 222 hectares is allocated to peat production, with private firm Vapo Oy contracted to exploit it and deliver peat to the power plant.

According to 1999 figures, Kajaani earns FIM 3 million a year by selling forestry products, and also receives a sizable income from tourist-related activities from its forests. Fishing also contributes to the income of people in the town. Kajaani has three main hotels, the 191-room Scandic Kajanus Kajaani, Hotel Kajaani and Original Sokos Hotel Valjus, although the Karolineburg Manor House now also functions as a hotel with 20 rooms. The Sirius restaurant serves Finnish cuisine and is housed in a former government building which hosted conferences between Leonid Brezhnev and Urho Kekkonen. Also of note is the Chinese restaurant Golden Dragon, the Torero which serves Spanish cuisine, Hospoda Kourna and Pikantti. The Central Hospital of Kainuu, which serves the wider region, is situated in Kajaani. Opened in 1968, it has a number of specialist medical departments andworks in cooperation with the Oulu University Hospital. The town also has an eye clinic.

Kainuu Brigade, a unit of the Finnish Army established in 1966, is the third biggest employer in the city. The brigade trains around 4,000 conscripts each year and employs 500 military personnel and 100 civilians.

In January 2025, it was announced that XTX Markets would be investing over $1 billion in development of a data-centre complex in Kajaani.

== Landmarks ==
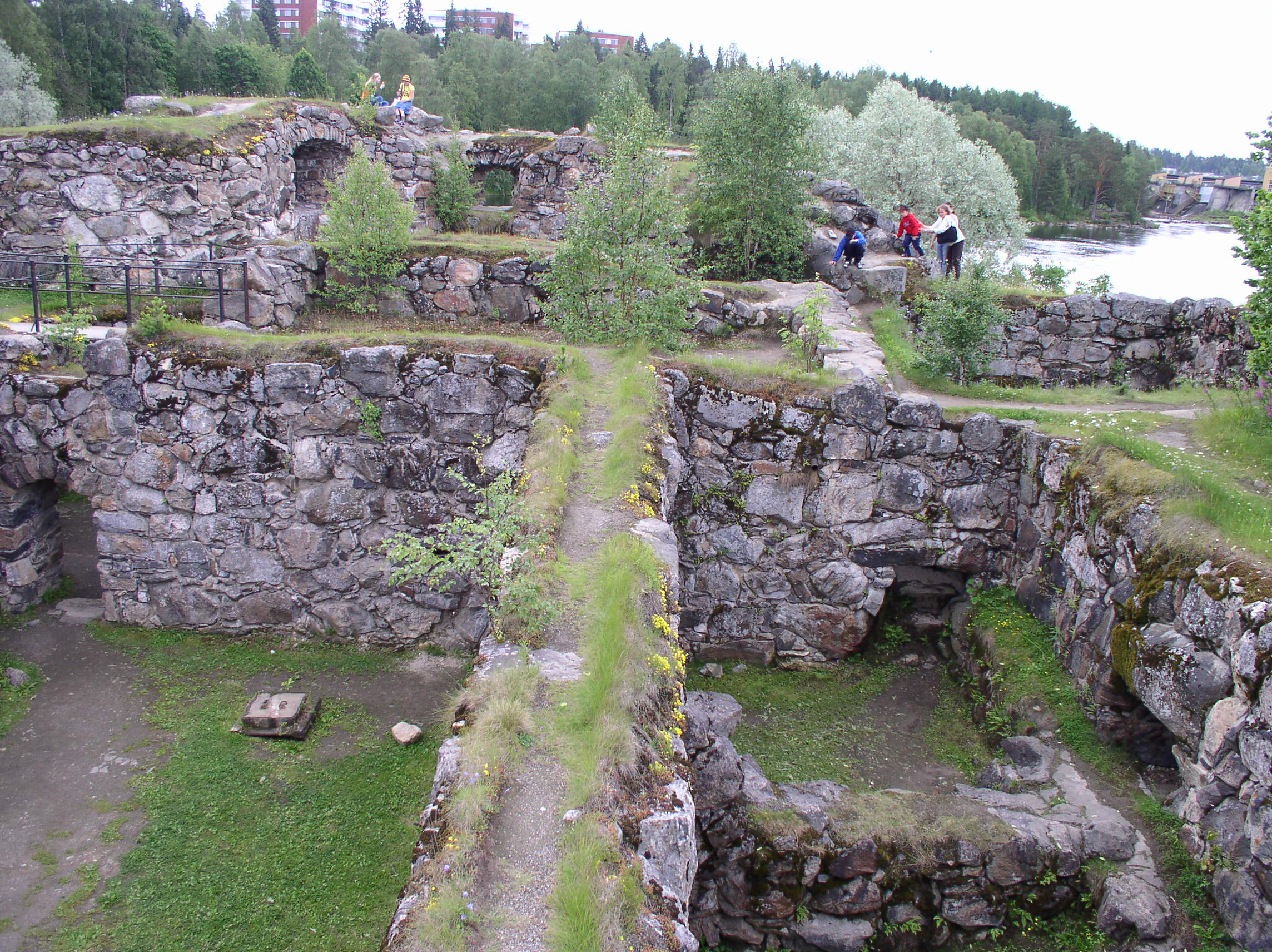
The ruins of Kajaani Castle

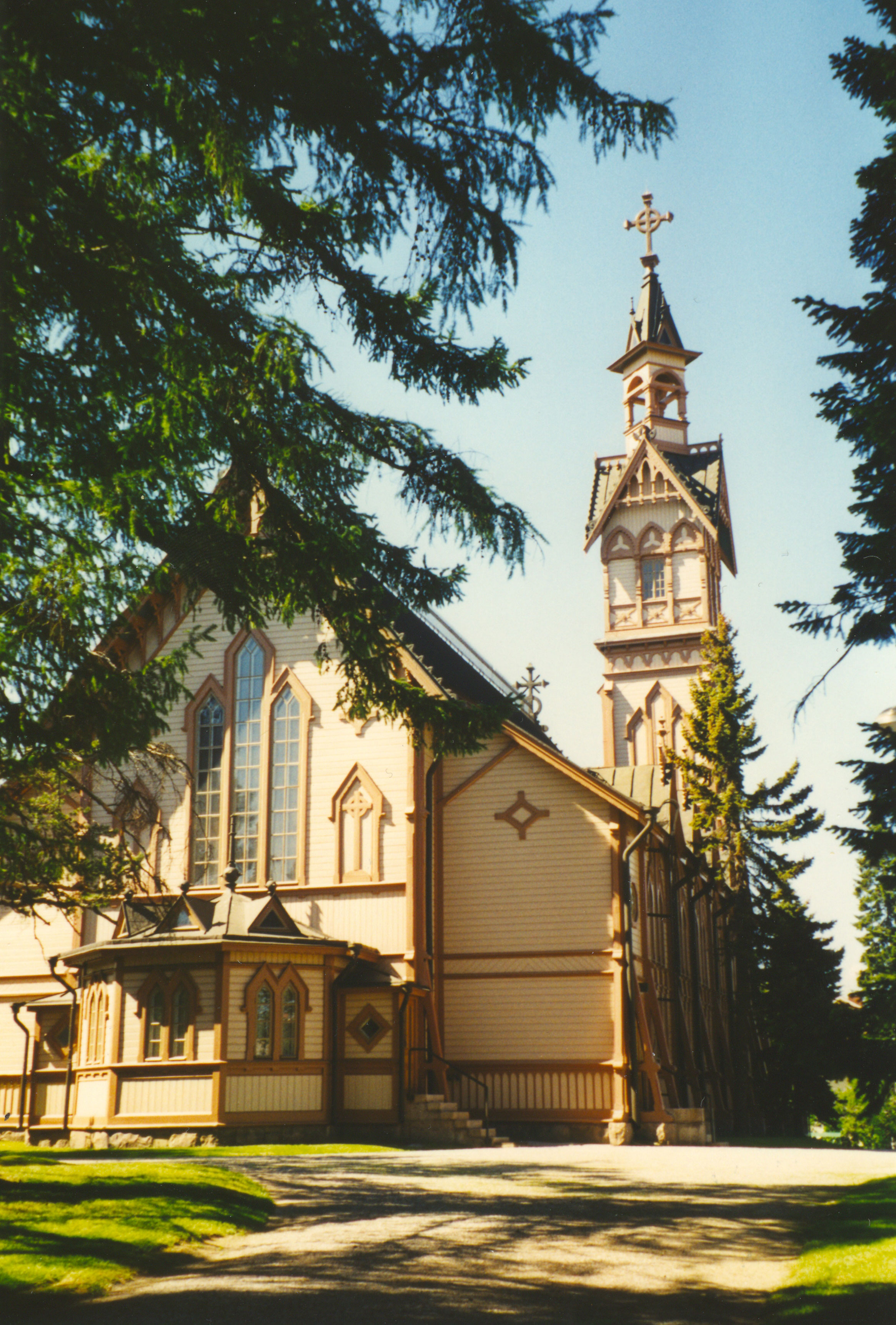
Church of Kajaani

Kajaani Castle, located on an island on the Kajaani river in the centre of the city, was originally built in 1604 and was commissioned by Charles IX of Sweden. The castle served as an administrative centre, prison, military base and a refuge for the citizens.

The Town Hall of Kajaani, on the main square, Raatihuoneentori, was built to the design of Carl Engel in 1831 with a central rooftop clocktower and turret. It underwent restoration in 1990 when it was painted in a "fetching yellow ochre" color.

Kajaani Church was built in 1896 in the Neo-Gothic style by architect Jac Ahrenberg. It replaced an earlier church on the spot which was originally built in 1656 and destroyed by the Russians in 1716 at the time when Kajaani castle was destroyed. The second church was built 1734-35 which served the parish for 160 years until replaced with Ahrenberg's new church. The church, built from wood, has three naves and features a delicate, slender bell tower. It is decorated with English Gothic style carvings.

Kajaani Orthodox Church (Kajaanin ortodoksinen seurakunta), which has a regional membership of about 1880 members is centred at Christ Church of the Transfiguration in Kajaani. The church was completed in 1959 to designs by Ilmari Ahonen. It contains murals painted by Petros Sasaki and Alkiviadis Kepolas. In the suburb of Paltaniemi is a church, originally built in 1599, and considered to be the regional centre for the Lutheran Church.

There is a mosque in the town, which is the center of the regional Kainuu Islamic community, which in 2013 had 174 members. Eino Leno House, containing a cafe, was built in 1978 to commemorate famous poet Eino Leino, a native of the town. Keisarintalli, a wooden stable, was used as a boarding house for Tsar Alexander I of Russia during his tour of Finland in 1819. Also of note is the Urho Kekkonen Memorial, dedicated to the eighth Finnish president, Urho Kekkonen. The 8 metres (26 ft) high monument was carved by sculptor Pekka Kauhanen and was unveiled on 3 September 1990, exactly 90 years after Kekkonen's birth.

== Culture ==
The Kajaani Town Theatre, established in 1969, puts on plays and concerts, typically seen by around 200 people. The Art Museum of Kajaani (Kajaanin taidemuseo), located in a building that was a police station, which is connected to Kajaani's former city hall. was founded in 1993 and centers on Finnish modern art. Kainuu Museum (Kainuun Museo) displays information related to the tar industry, the Kalevala (the national epic of Finland) and author Elias Lönnrot and others on the ground floor, and regularly hosts temporary exhibitions upstairs.

The most notable annual cultural events in Kajaani are Kajaanin Runoviikko (The Kajaani Poetry Week), originally known as Sana ja Sävel, and Kainuun JazzKevät (The Kainuu Jazz Spring). Kajaani Orchestra began in the 1950s, and was expanded when the Kuopio garrison band moved to Kajaani in 1963.

Radio Kajaus, one of Finland's oldest local radios, began operations in Kajaani in 1989, and remains one of the few completely independent radio stations in Finland. Kainuu Radio, which belongs to the Yle, broadcasts Monday to Friday from 6.30 to 17.00.

== Education ==
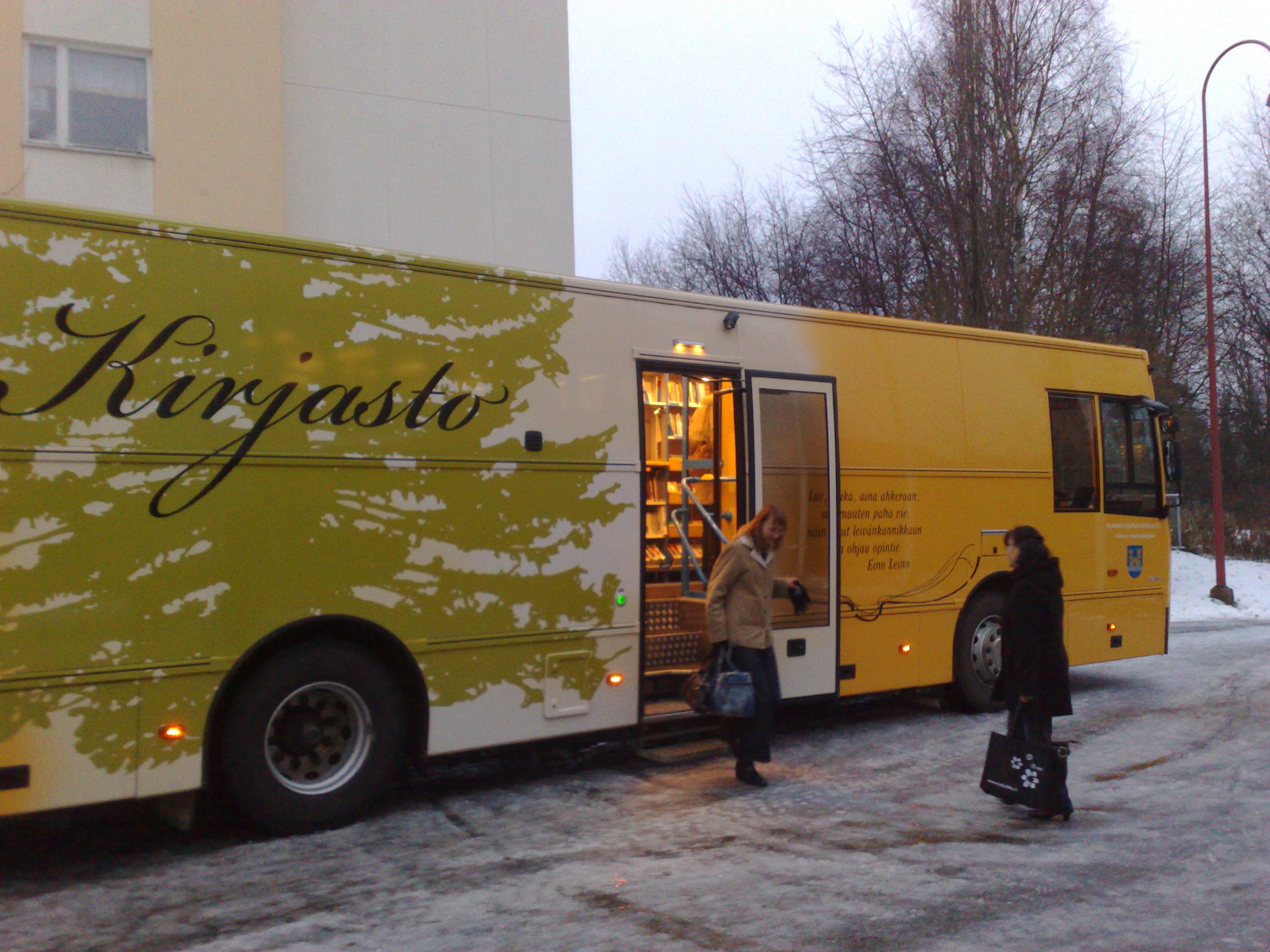
Kajaani mobile library

The town is served by the Kajaani University of Applied Sciences, a small university of applied sciences which was established in 1992. It provides courses in Activity Tourism, Information Systems, Nursing and Healthcare, Mechanical and Mining Engineering and Business and Innovations, and offers 8 Bachelor's degree programmes and 5 Master programmes delivered in Finnish. The Research Center for Developmental Teaching and Learning at Kajaani University Consortium is associated with the University of Oulu. There is also a polytechnical institute in Kajaani, which had an enrollment of 653 students in the mid 1990s. In 2022, the 550 PetaFLOP LUMI (Large Unified Modern Infrastructure) supercomputer began operation at the CSC data center in the town, where it has been confirmed as the fastest supercomputer in Europe and among the top five in the world.

The government-run Kainuu Music Institute was founded in 1957, and is part of the Kaukametsä Congress and Culture Centre. It is one of the largest musical institutes in Finland, with an enrollment of about 900 from the wider Kainuu region. Kainuu Music dance department Ballet Kaukametsä teaches dance to dancers of different ages. The public library of Kajaani is situated on Kauppakatu street and has free Internet access, and there is also a mobile library service. The Kajaani Journal has been publishing since at least 1919.

== Sports ==
Kajaani has two football clubs, AC Kajaani and Kajaanin Haka. AC Kajaani was formed in 2006 after the merger of FC Tarmo and Kajaanin Palloilijat (KaPa), and plays their home games at the Kajaanin Liikuntapuisto. The men's football first team currently plays in the Kakkonen (Division 2). Kajaanin Haka was formed in 1953 and plays at the Kajaanin liikuntapuisto stadium. The men's football first team currently plays in the Kolmonen (Division 3). The local ice hockey team, Hokki, plays in the Mestis league. Kajaani ice rink (Kajaanin jäähalli) was inaugurated in 1989 and accommodates for 2372 spectators, 781 in seating and 1591 in standing. There is a race course (Kajaanin ravirata) about 9 miles (14 km) to the north of the centre of Kajaani in Kuluntalahden, which hosts competitions only during the summer season. The track was completed in 2008 with a new café-restaurant.

Kajaani has hiking paths, skiing tracks, gyms, and sports grounds within the municipality. Pöllyvaara and the Vimpeli Hills are notable local ski areas, frequented by tourists during the winter months. Fishing is popular along the banks of the river. Kajaani also has a golf course, and there are also several dancing pavilions in the town.

== Transport ==
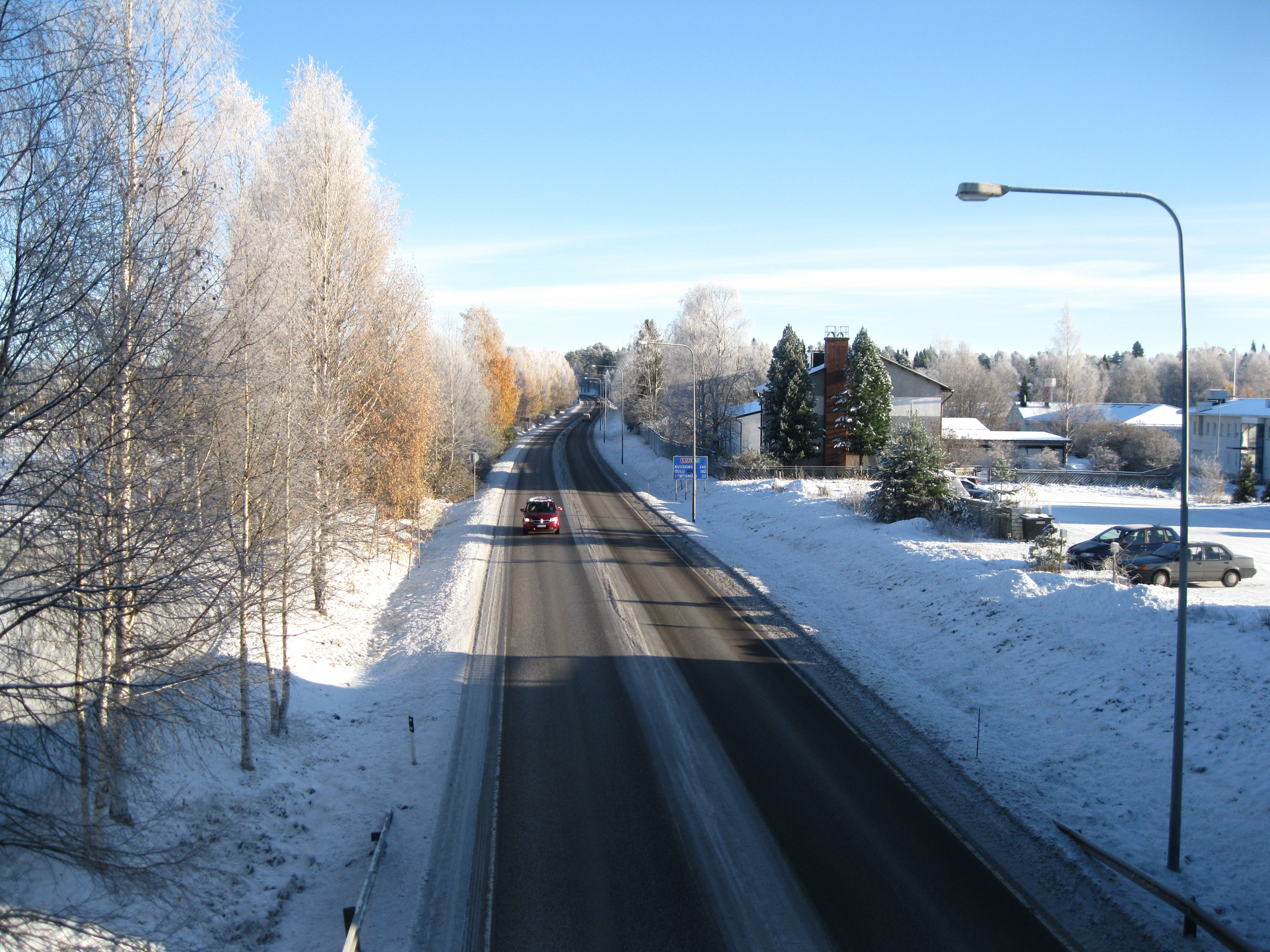
Highway 5 (E63) in Kajaani

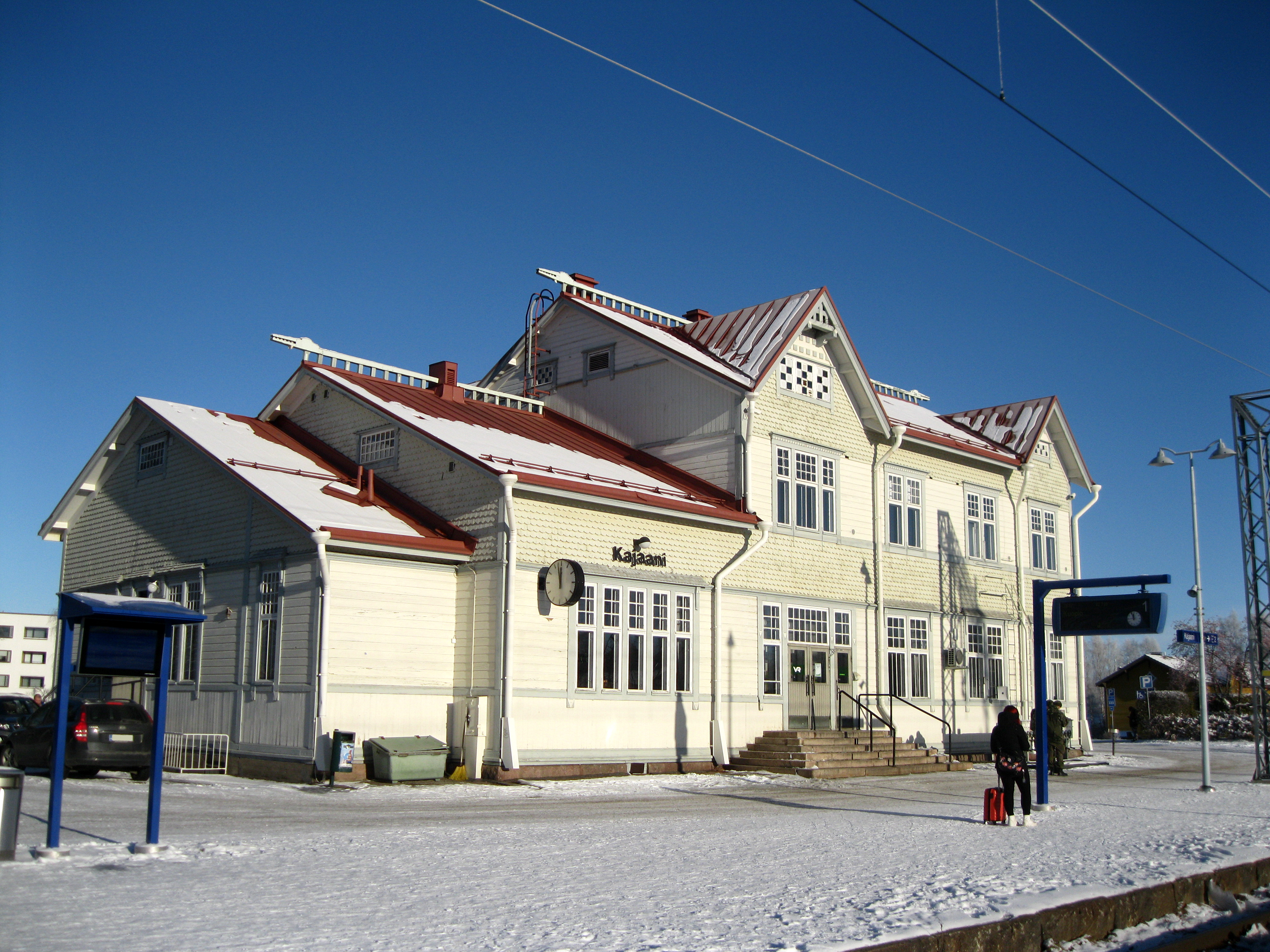
Kajaani railway station

There are two important highways from the direction of Helsinki to Kajaani: Highway 5 (E63) and Highway 6. In addition, Highway 22 leads to Kajaani from the direction of Oulu. There is a daily bus service operating between Kajaani, Oulu, Kemijärvi and Rukatunturi, and Bus No.4 runs hourly during weekdays from Pohjolankatu in Kajaani to Paltaniemi. During the summer months there is a cruise service operating between Joensuu and Nurmes.

Kajaani railway station opened in 1905 when the railway from Iisalmi to Kajaani was completed as an extension to the Savonia railroad. The station building was designed by Gustaf Nyström. The Kajaani station trackyard underwent significant upgrading and repair work in 2005, when the railway from Iisalmi to Kontiomäki was electrified. Four trains arrive daily from Helsinki via Kouvola and Kuopio, with the journey taking 7–10 hours to Helsinki depending on the train. There are also daily trains from Joensuu, and connecting trains between Nurmes and Kajaani.

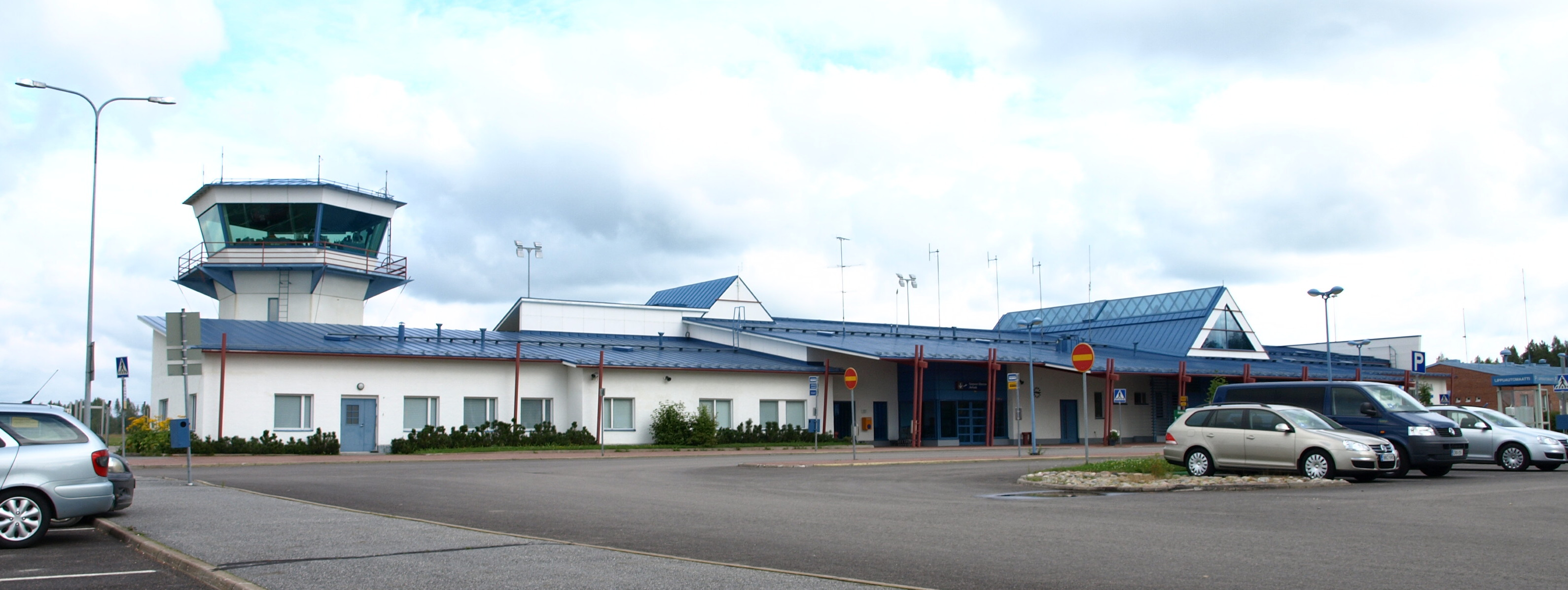
Kajaani Airport

Kajaani Airport, approximately 7 kilometres (4 mi) northwest of Kajaani in the Paltaniemi area, is the main local airport. It is operated by Finavia, and also serves needs of non-commercial general aviation. Construction of the airport began in 1939 with the runway being completed in the autumn, but due to World War it was not fully opened until 22 June 1956. Aegean Airlines and Flybe Nordic provides flights to Chania and Helsinki. The Finnair connection to Helsinki operates during the summer twice daily and three times a day during the winter schedule period. In 2013 the airport served 74,558 passengers.

== Notable people ==
- Antti Halonen, ice hockey player
- Eino Leino, poet and journalist
- Elias Lönnrot, philologist and poetry collector; compiler of The Kalevala
- Henrik Flöjt, biathlon athlete
- Janari Jõesaar, Estonian men's national basketball team player
- Jorma Korhonen, judoka
- Jouko Karjalainen, skier
- Marko Kemppainen, skeet shooter
- Matti Heikkinen, skier
- Mika Lavento, professor of archaeology
- Olli Malmivaara, ice hockey player
- Pekka Suorsa, ski jumper
- Riku Nieminen, actor and dancer
- Sakari Kukko, musician
- Tommi Leinonen, ice hockey player
- Urho Kekkonen, 8th President of Finland
- Kasperi Heikkinen, Guitar player

== International relations ==
=== Twin towns — Sister cities ===
Kajaani is twinned with:

City	Country	Year	Ref
Östersund	Sweden	1943	
Rostov-on-Don	Russia	1956−2022	
Schwalm-Eder-Kreis	Germany	1973	
Nyíregyháza	Hungary	1981	
Marquette	United States	1997	
Jiujiang	China	2006	
Bayonne	France	2008	

== See also ==
- Kuusamo
- Oulu
- Sotkamo
- Vuolijoki
