= Hyrynsalmi =

- Municipality
- Hyrynsalmen kunta Hyrynsalmi kommun
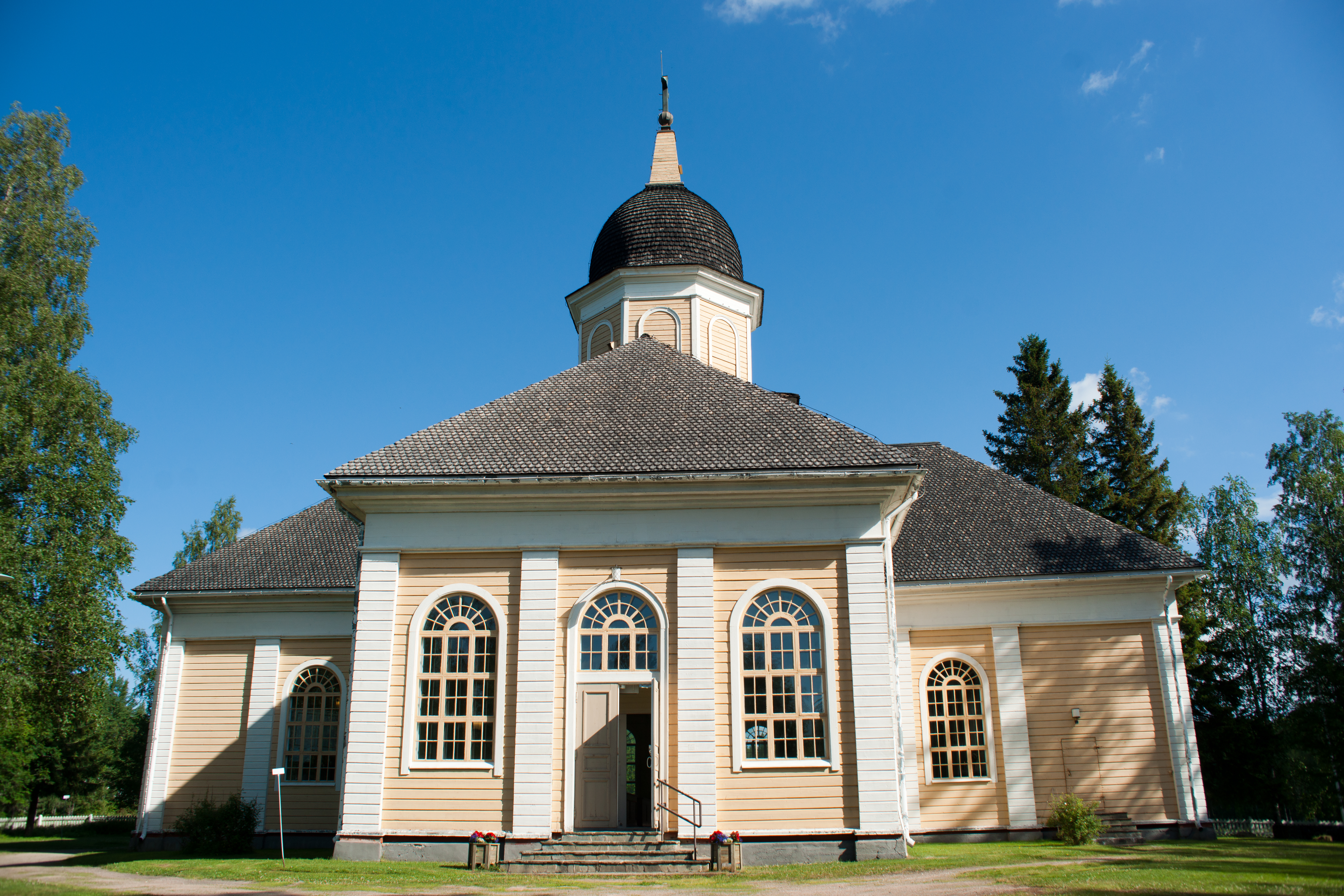
- Hyrynsalmi Church

- Coat of arms

- Location of Hyrynsalmi in Finland
- Interactive map of Hyrynsalmi
- Coordinates: 64°40.5′N 028°29.5′E
- Country: Finland
- Region: Kainuu
- Sub-region: Kehys-Kainuu
- Founded (parish): 1786

Government
  - Municipal manager: Jouni Ponnikas

Area (2018-01-01)
  - Total: 1,521.38 km^{2} (587.41 sq mi)
  - Land: 1,421.27 km^{2} (548.76 sq mi)
  - Water: 100.32 km^{2} (38.73 sq mi)
  - Rank: 50th largest in Finland

Population (2025-12-31)
  - Total: 1,984
  - Rank: 256th largest in Finland
  - Density: 1.4/km^{2} (3.6/sq mi)

Population by native language
  - Finnish: 97.7% (official)
  - Others: 2.3%

Population by age
  - 0 to 14: 9.2%
  - 15 to 64: 49.3%
  - 65 or older: 41.5%
- Time zone: UTC+02:00 (EET)
  - Summer (DST): UTC+03:00 (EEST)
- Website: www.hyrynsalmi.fi

Hyrynsalmi is a municipality in Finland and is part of the Kainuu region.

The municipality has a population of 1,984 (31 December 2025) and covers an area of 1,521.38 square kilometres (587.41 sq mi) of which 100.32 km^{2} (38.73 sq mi) is water. The population density is 1.4 inhabitants per square kilometre (3.6/sq mi).

The municipality is unilingually Finnish.

The world championships in swamp football is held annually in Hyrynsalmi.

== History ==
The municipality got its name (meaning "Hyry's Strait") from the Hyrynsalmi strait, which got its name from the Hyrynjärvi lake. The lake was named by Ostrobothnian huntsmen after the family name Hyry.

== Politics ==
Results of the 2023 Finnish parliamentary election in Hyrynsalmi:

- Centre Party 33.7%
- Finns Party 30.6%
- Left Alliance 13.3%
- Social Democratic Party 8.8%
- Christian Democrats 6.4%
- National Coalition Party 4.9%
- Green League 1.2%

As of 2021 Finnish municipal elections, Hyrynsalmi municipal council is made up of: Centre Party (13 seats), Social Democratic Party (4), Left Alliance (2), and Finns Party (2).
