= Vuorokas mine =

Mine in Finland

Coordinates: 64°6′37.8″N 27°10′8.1″E

- Location within Finland
- Location: Finland
- Products: Vanadium

Vuorokas iron mine was active in Vuolijoki during the years 1965-1985. During this time there were mined 1.348 million tons of ore. The ore contained on average 34% iron, 7.5% titanium and 0.2% vanadium. Together with Otanmäki mine Vuorokas mine was a major vanadium producer in the world.
