= Vuolijoki =

Former municipality in the country of Finland

Coordinates: 64°11′00″N 26°59′50″E

Vuolijoen kunta
Coat of Arms / Location
Founded	1915
Province	Oulu
Region	Kainuu
Sub-region	Kajaani
Area: Of which land; Rank	895.20 km^{2} 692.15 km^{2} ranked 78th
Population: Density; Change; Rank	2,643 (2004); 3.8 inhabitants/km^{2} + 0.4% ranked 313th
Urbanisation	18.8%
Unemployment	18.9%
Official language	Finnish
Last Municipal manager	Olavi Rintala
Home page

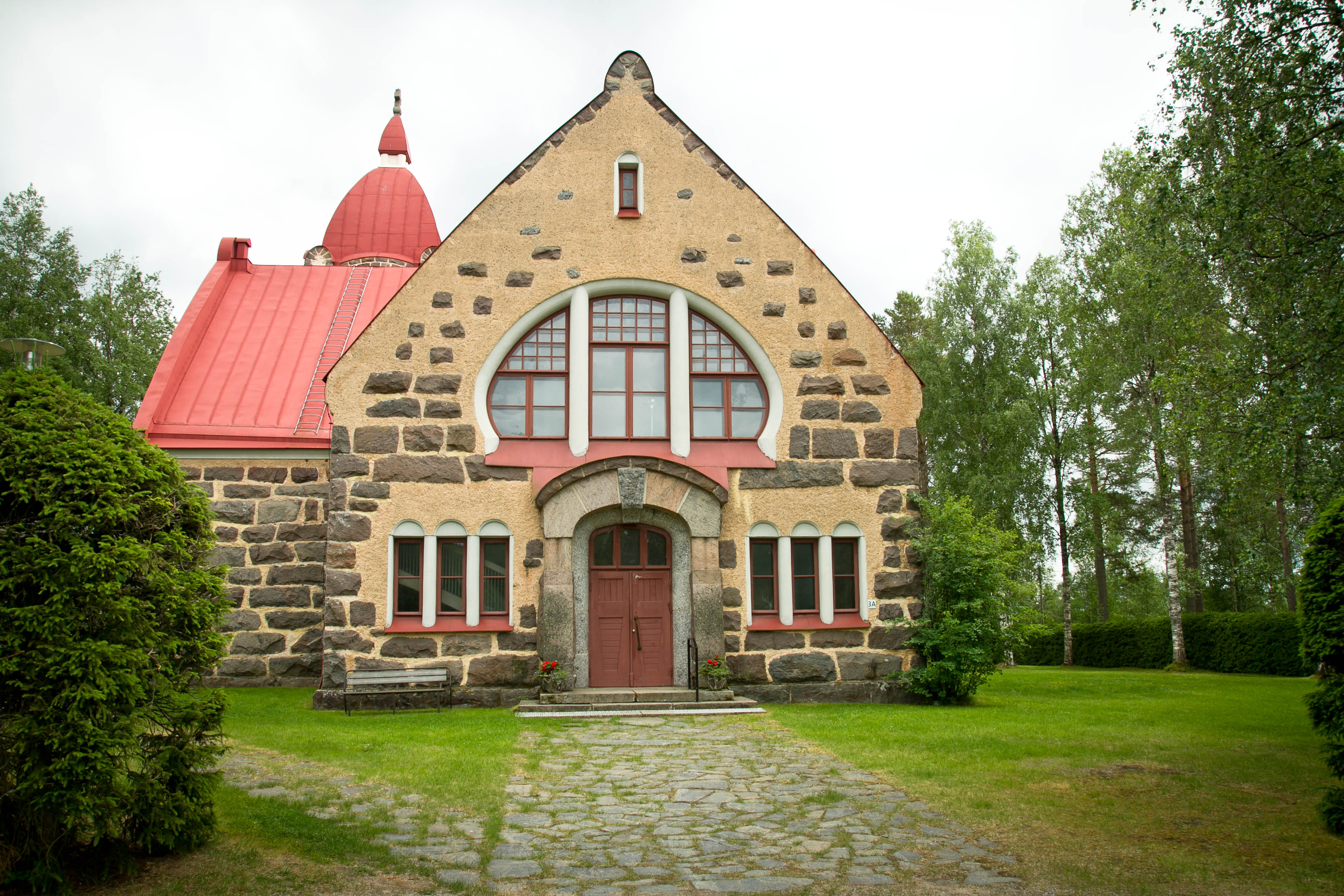
Vuolijoki Church

Vuolijoki (Finnish pronunciation: [ˈʋuo̯liˌjoki]) is a former municipality in Finland. The municipality was consolidated with the city of Kajaani in the beginning of year 2007.

Vuolijoki was located in the province of Oulu on the shores of Lake Oulujärvi, and was part of the Kainuu region. In 2004 the municipality had a population of 2,643 and covered an area of 895.20 km^{2} of which 203.05 km^{2} was water. The population density was 3.8 inhabitants per km^{2}. The municipality was unilingually Finnish.

The 1906 greystone church, the Vuolijoki Church, designed by Josef Stenbäck, is located in the church village of Vuolijoki. The Vuolijoki was also known for its two iron mines: the Otanmäki mine and the Vuorokas mine.

== See also ==
- Otanmäki
