= Kajaani Church =

Church building in Kajaani, Finland

Coordinates: 64°13′30″N 27°43′44″E

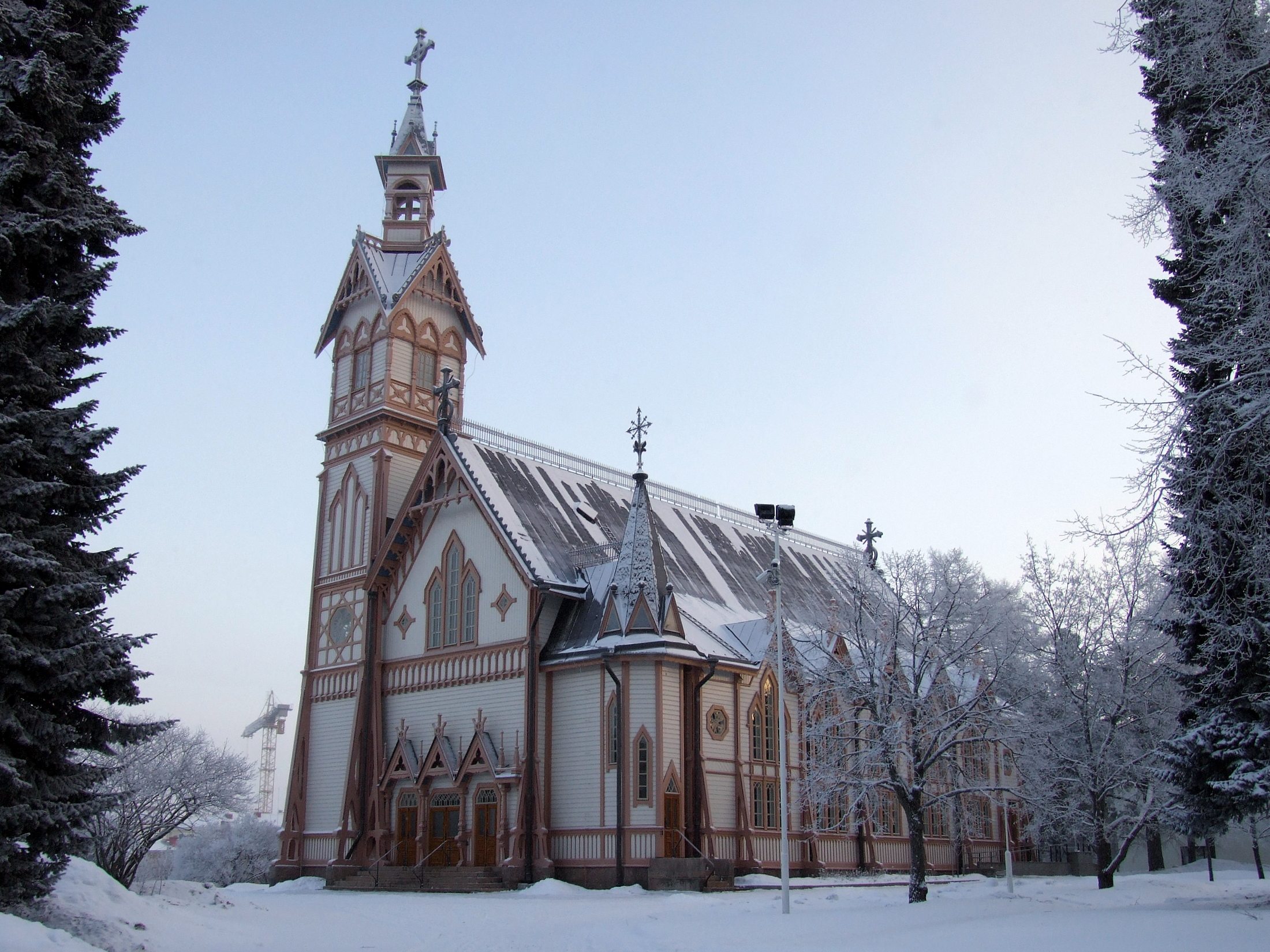

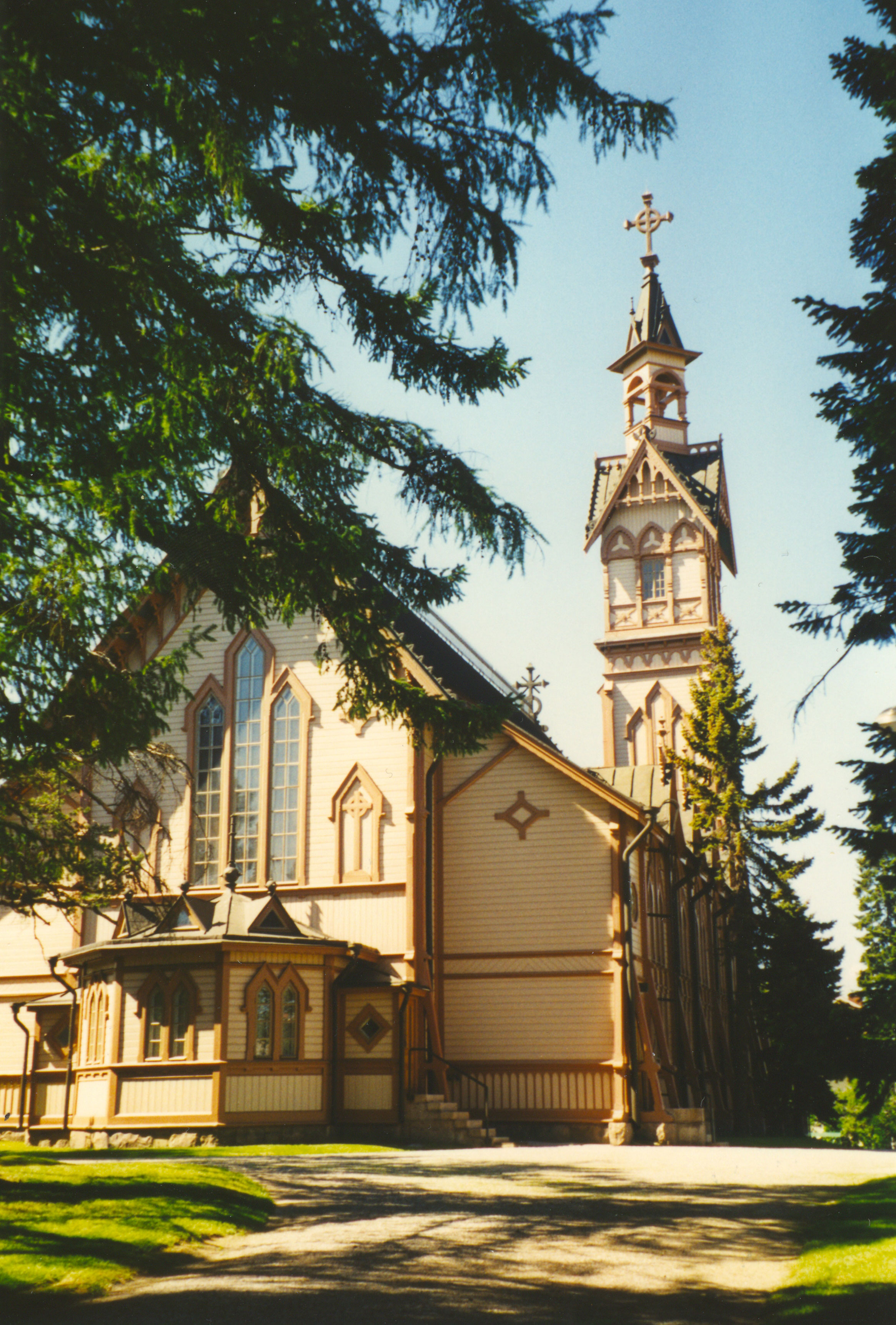
Church of Kajaani

Kajaani Church (Finnish: Kajaanin kirkko) is a church in Kajaani, Finland. It was built in 1896 in the Neo-Gothic style by architect Jac Ahrenberg.

== History ==
The current church replaced an earlier church on the spot which was originally built in 1656 and destroyed by the Russians in 1716 at the time when Kajaani castle was destroyed. The second church was built 1734-35 which served the parish for 160 years until replaced with Ahrenberg's new church.

== Architecture ==
The church, built of wood, has a nave flanked by two aisles and features a delicate, slender bell tower. It is decorated with English Gothic style carvings.
