= Jakob Henrik Zidén =

Finnish army officer (1785–1808)

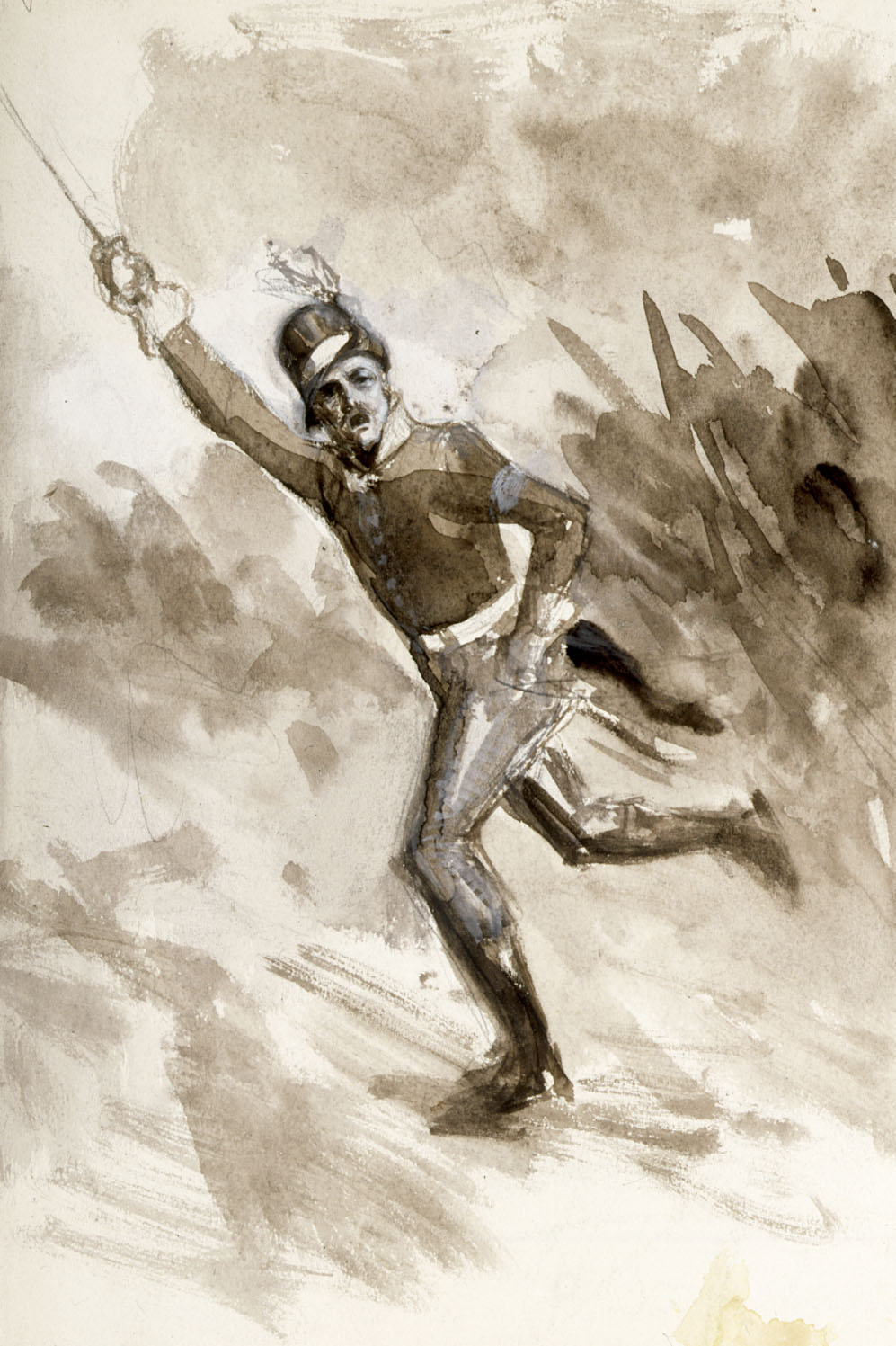
Jakob Henrik Zidén, drawing by Albert Edelfelt.

Jakob Henrik Zidén (31 October 1785 – 27 October 1808) was a Finnish officer, acclaimed for his bravery in the defence of Kuopio in 1808–09. He died near Iisalmi in the Battle of Koljonvirta between the Swedes and Russians in 1808 which was a Swedish victory.

Zidén was born in Marttila; his father, the provost Jakob Zidén, was of West Finnish descent and his mother, Kristina Elisabet Fahlberg, was from a Swedish family. He started his military career in 1797 at the age of 11, as a driver in the Turku provincial regiment. After studying in Turku, he withdrew in 1801, but by 1804 he had re-enlisted and that year was promoted to feldwebel.

He distinguished himself in the Finnish War, particularly in the Battle of Haistila on 17 March 1808, and was promoted to ensign in the newly organised Vasa regiment. He was reportedly "not very precise in his duties", but he again distinguished himself with his bravery in the attack on Kuopio that June, and was mentioned in dispatches by Löwenhjelm. In the Battle of Koljonvirta on 27 October 1808, he led his platoon in the attack against the Russians but was mortally wounded in the forehead by grapeshot.

Zidén was awarded medals of bravery in both silver and gold, and his name was included on the Virta Monument raised in 1885. He is also the subject of a poem, "Löjtnant Zidén", in Johan Ludvig Runeberg's The Tales of Ensign Stål (Runeberg promoted him to lieutenant).

He was married to Albertina Kreander, who remarried after his death to Johan Ithimaeus, a paymaster.
