= Kivesjärvi =

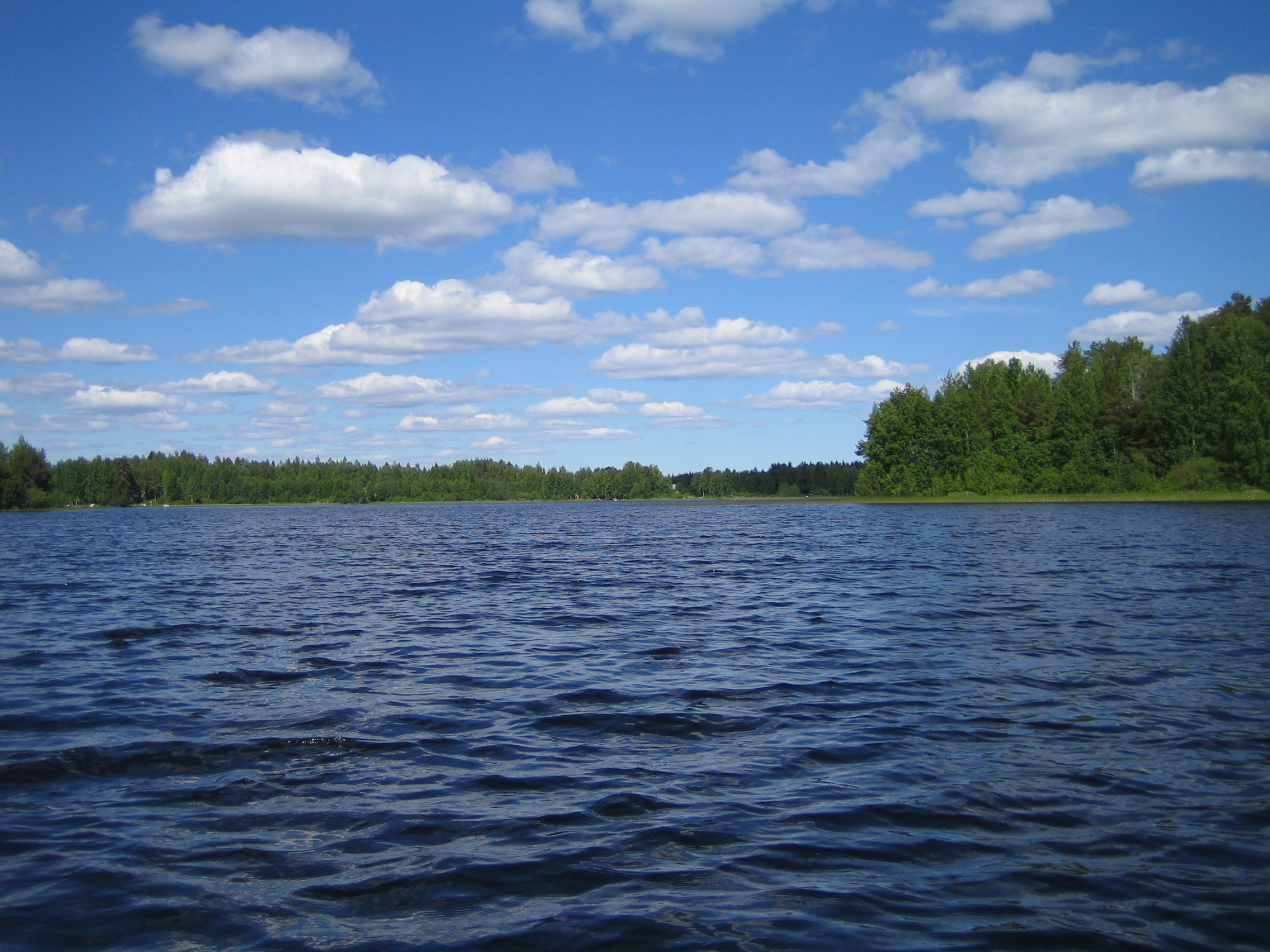

- Location within Finland
- Location: Paltamo
- Coordinates: 64°27′N 27°25′E
- Type: Lake
- Primary inflows: Isokoski rapids
- Primary outflows: Varisjoki, Alanteenjoki
- Catchment area: Oulujoki
- Basin countries: Finland
- Surface area: 25.743 km^{2} (9.939 sq mi)
- Average depth: 4.09 m (13.4 ft)
- Max. depth: 12.5 m (41 ft)
- Water volume: 0.105 km^{3} (85,000 acre⋅ft)
- Shore length^{1}: 88.74 km (55.14 mi)
- Surface elevation: 135.1 m (443 ft)
- Islands: Poronsaari, Hangonsaari
- Settlements: Paltamo, Kivesjärvi (village)
- ^{1} Shore length is not a well-defined measure.

Kivesjärvi is a medium-sized lake in Paltamo, Finland. The name Kivesjärvi literally means "testicle lake". Some say that the name derive from old giant-related folklore around the region, some say that the name originally related to the ancient word for gillnet weight, "kives", and only later became associated with the modern meaning of the word. Its average depth is four metres and the deepest point is sixteen metres deep. There is a village of the same name on the coast of the lake. The lake's area is 27 square kilometres. It is the 136th biggest lake in Finland. The lake has many islands and islets.

Kivesjärvi is a bifurcation lake, because there are two outflows: the original route is river Alanteenjoki to the lake Alanteenjärvi. In the 19th century the timber rafting workers needed a shorter route to the Oulujärvi. They made a new river named Varisjoki, and most of the outflow started to flow via it, although Kivesjärvi is still a bifurcation lake.
