= Säräisniemi =

Village in North Ostrobothnia, Finland

- Village
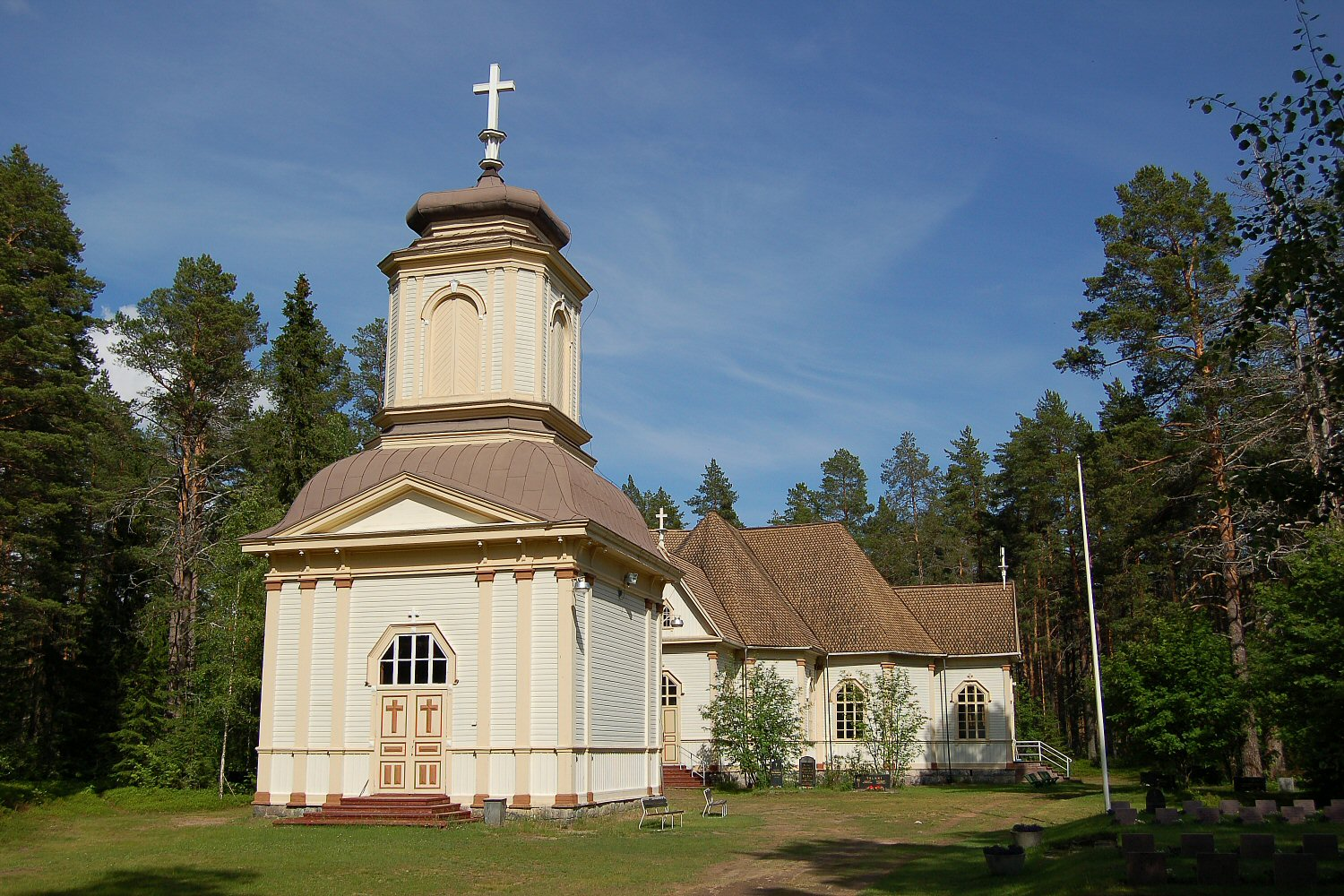
- Säräisniemi Church

- Location in Finland
- Coordinates: 64°26′40″N 026°47′05″E
- Country: Finland
- Region: North Ostrobothnia
- Municipality: Vaala

Area
  - Total: 4.649 km^{2} (1.795 sq mi)

Population (31 December 2015)
  - Total: 66
- Time zone: UTC+2 (EET)
  - Summer (DST): UTC+3 (EEST)
- Postal code: 91760

Säräisniemi (Finnish pronunciation: [ˈsæræi̯sˌnie̯mi]) is a village in the Vaala municipality in North Ostrobothnia, Finland. The village was the municipal center of the then Säräisniemi municipality until 1954. The village is located on the west side of Lake Oulujärvi, on the shore of Niskanselkä, on a long cape of the same name, about 15 kilometres (9.3 mi) from Vaala's town centre, 30 kilometres (19 mi) from Kestilä and 41 kilometres (25 mi) from Vuolijoki.

The Finnish settlement in the Säräisniemi region began in 1552 when the Swedish King Gustav Vasa ordered the Savonian people to settle the wilderness surrounding Lake Oulujärvi. Säräisniemi separated from the Paltamo parish to become a chapel parish in 1779 and became an independent parish in 1865. The Säräisniemi Church, which was the second church in the lake region after Manamansalo's church, was completed in 1781.

The first school building in Säräisniemi parish, completed in 1884, currently houses a local history museum, which displays agricultural and household items collected from the Vaala municipality. The popular Camping Happy Beach is also located near Lake Oulujärvi.

== Sources ==
=== Further reading ===
- Haataja, Matti (2006). Säräisniemi – kirkon kylä (in Finnish). Säräisniemi: Säräisniemen kyläyhdistys ry. ISBN 952-91-9905-8.
