= Alassalmi Ferry =

Coordinates: 64°20′30″N 026°54′13″E

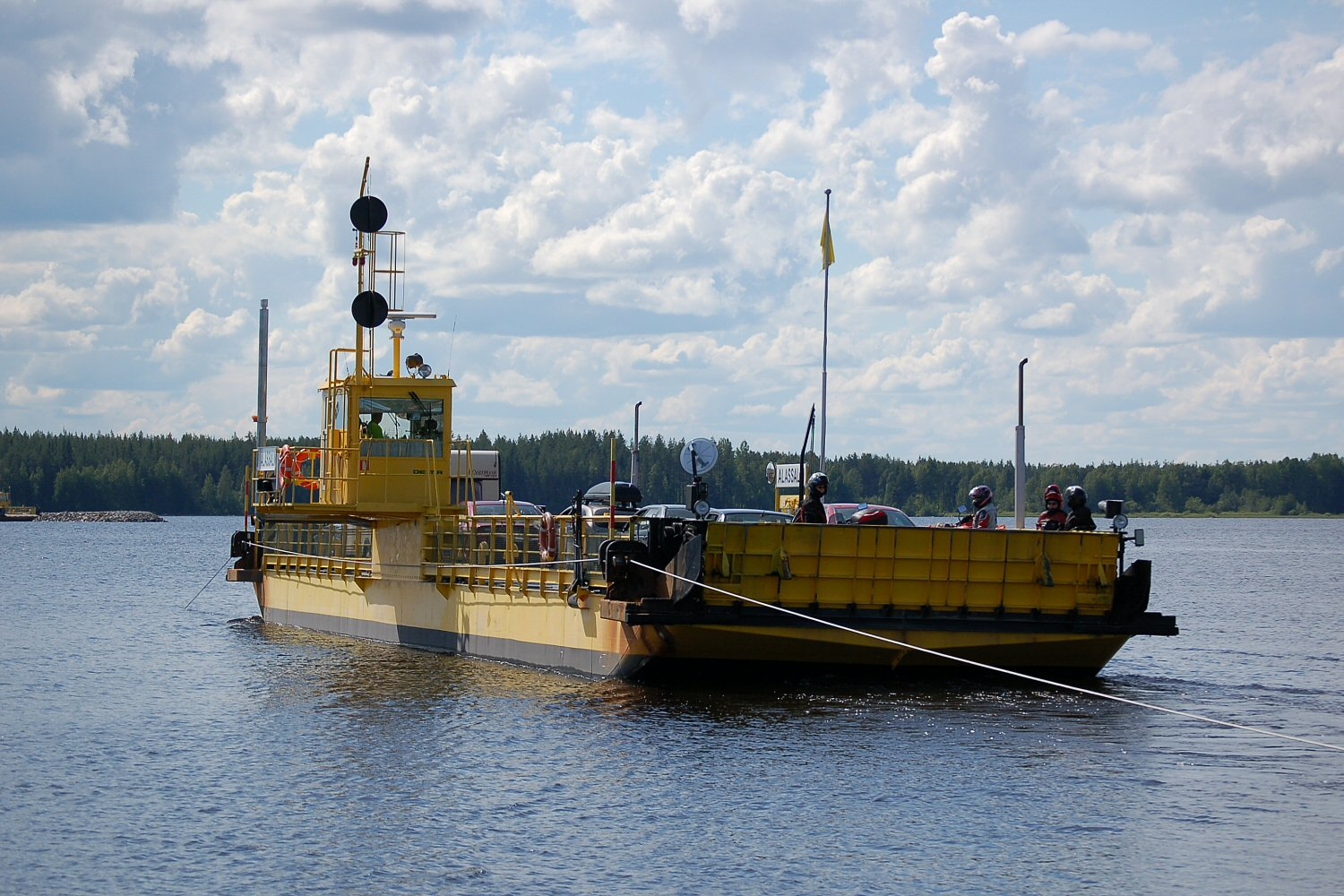
Alassalmi ferry departing Manamansalo

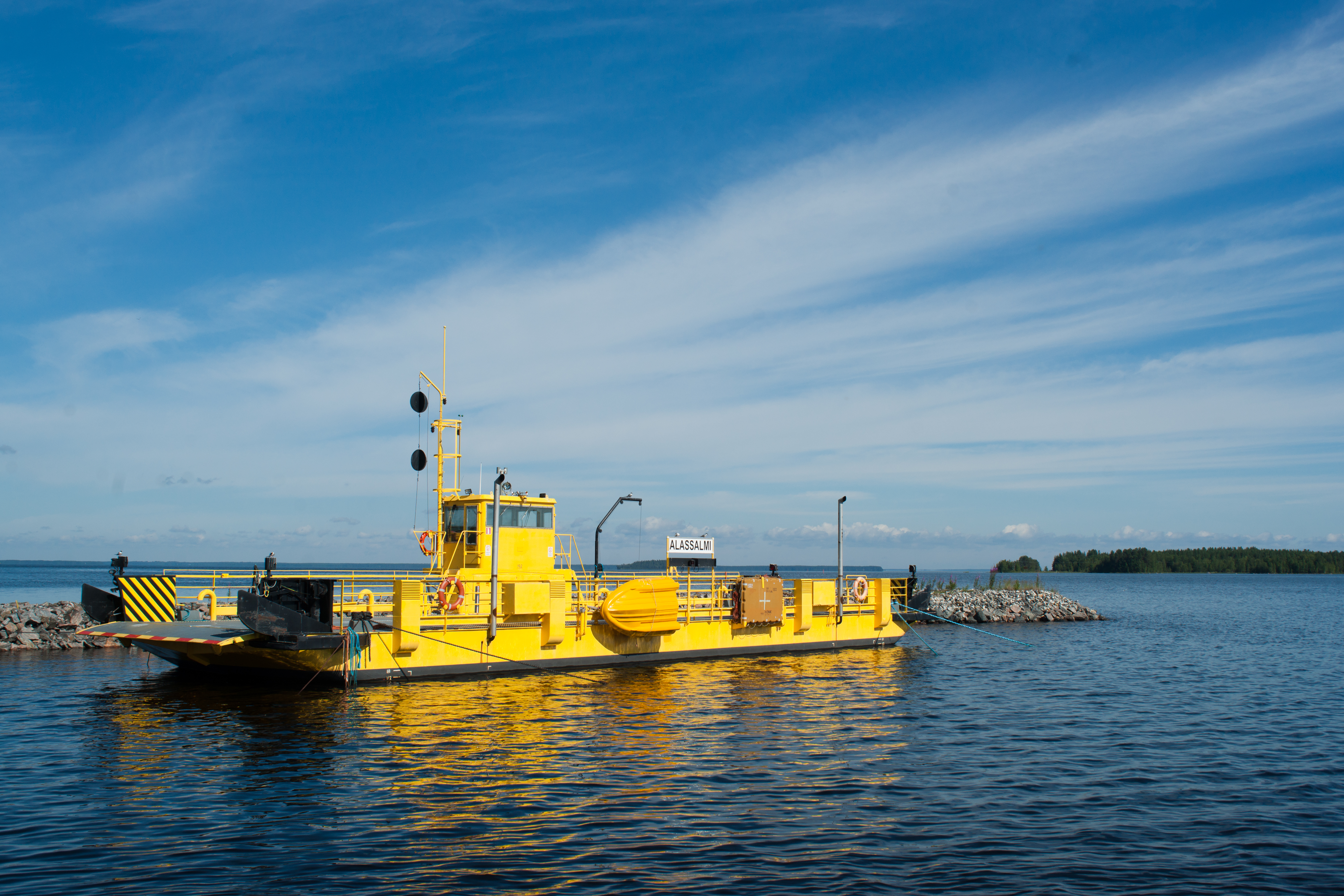
The ferry in Alassalmi

The Alassalmi Ferry is a cable ferry linking Manamansalo island and mainland, across the Alassalmi strait on lake Oulujärvi, in Finland.

The ferry links the south-western coast of Manamansalo island with the west of lake Oulujärvi, on the municipality of Vaala in Kainuu, Finland. The crossing is 700 metres (2,300 ft) long, and is used by road 8820.

The route us currently served by the ferry L-158, which was built at the Parkano shipyard in 1974; with a deadweight of 120 ton and a 2.2-metre (7 ft 3 in) draught. The ferry is 36.3 metres (119 ft) long and 6.8 metres (22 ft) wide and can carry 60 tonnes (59 long tons; 66 short tons), allowing for 14 cars.

She is operated by the FinFerries company.
