= Vaala (village) =

Village in North Ostrobothnia, Finland

Vaalan kirkonkylä
- Municipal centre
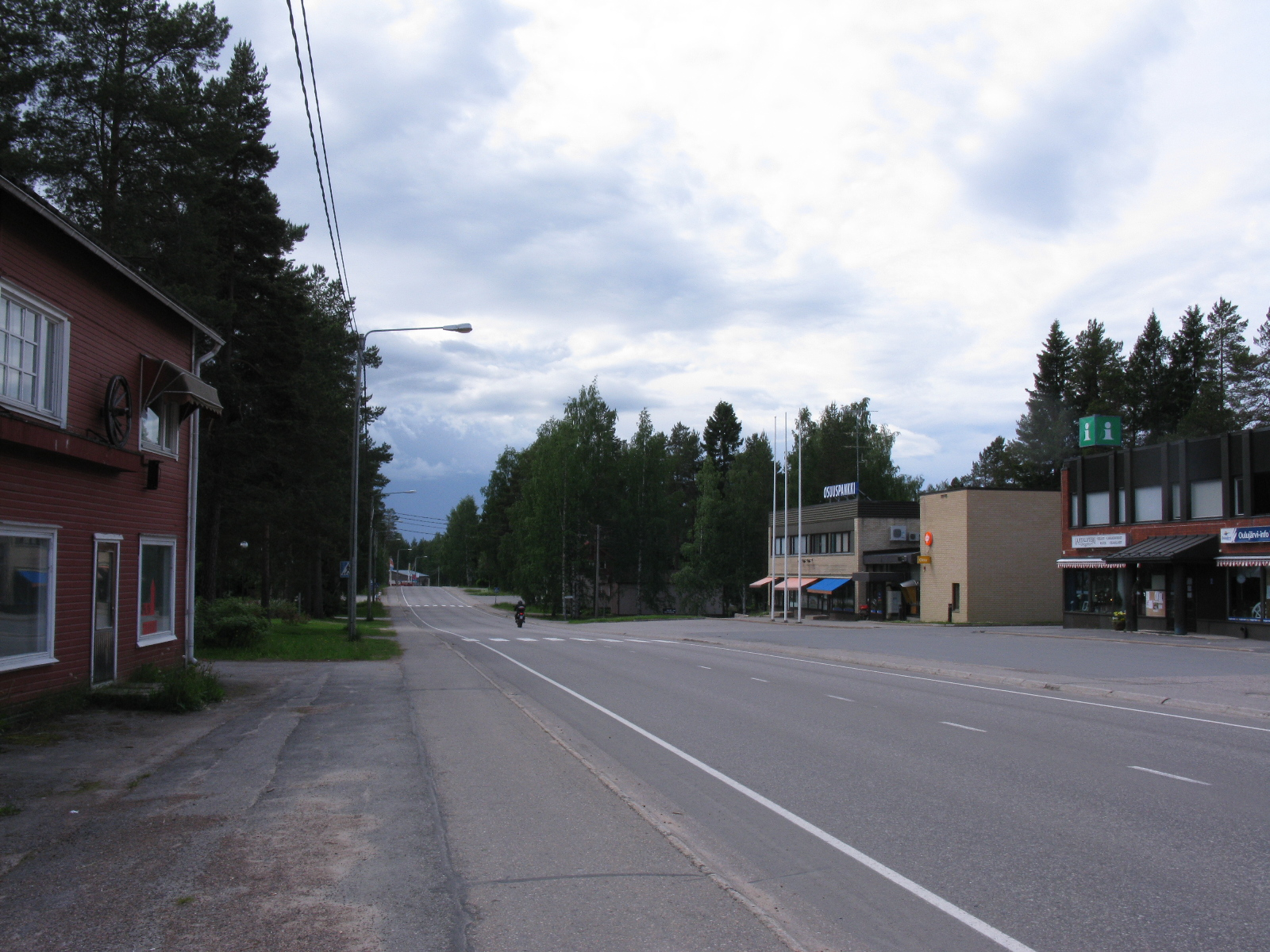
- The village center seen from the south.

- Location in Finland
- Coordinates: 64°33′34.99″N 26°50′24.97″E
- Country: Finland
- Region: North Ostrobothnia
- Municipality: Vaala

Area
  - Total: 2.66 km^{2} (1.03 sq mi)

Population (31 December 2023)
  - Total: 1,094
  - Density: 4,113/km^{2} (10,650/sq mi)
- Time zone: UTC+2 (EET)
  - Summer (DST): UTC+3 (EEST)
- Postal code: 91701

Vaalan kirkonkylä (lit. 'Vaala church village') is the administrative center of the Vaala municipality in North Ostrobothnia, Finland, and also its only urban area with a population of more than 1,000. It is located on the northwestern shore of Lake Oulujärvi at the mouth of the Oulujoki River, along the route 800 between Puolanka and Siikalatva's Kestilä. The distance to Oulu is about 90 kilometres (56 mi).

The village has a railway station, which operates along the Oulu–Kontiomäki railway. The village is also home to the 1960s Vaala Church, two grocery stores (S-market and K-Market), a health center, a pharmacy, a fire station, a municipal library and two schools: a comprehensive school and a high school. An inn called Majatalo Varis offers accommodation right in the centre.

== See also ==
- Säräisniemi
