= Keith Bosley =

British poet and translator (1937–2018)

- Bosley in 2013
- Born: Keith Anthony Bosley; 16 September 1937; Bourne End, Buckinghamshire, England
- Died: 24 June 2018 (aged 80); Slough, Berkshire, England
- Occupations: Poet, translator
- Honours: Knight of the Order of the White Rose of Finland

Keith Anthony Bosley (16 September 1937 – 24 June 2018) was a British poet, translator, and radio broadcaster. Born in Bourne End, Buckinghamshire, he studied French at university before starting his career at the BBC, where he worked primarily as a newsreader. Although he published three volumes of original poetry, Bosley is best known for his work as a translator. A polyglot, he claimed to have translated poetry to English from up to forty languages, and had published collections translated from Finnish, French, Portuguese, Hebrew, Vietnamese, Polish, Russian, and German.

== Career ==
Keith Anthony Bosley was born in Bourne End, Buckinghamshire on 16 September 1937. His father was a signalman, and worked on nearby rail-lines. Growing up and beginning school in Maidenhead, Berkshire, he later attended Sir William Borlase's Grammar School in Marlow. From 1956, Bosley studied French at the University of Reading under Michael Hamburger, continuing at Sorbonne University and the University of Caen Normandy; he graduated in 1960.

Finishing university, Bosley started work with the BBC in 1961, as an announcer and newsreader for the World Service at Bush House. There, he wrote many scripts, some comprising series on poetry and literature to be read himself, and also delivered announcements to open and close programmes including "From Our Own Correspondent". Bosley did shift work with the BBC, working both day and night shifts: this allowed him to spend some time at work translating. Bosley has been praised for his voice, being described as having a "distinctive, resonant and musical voice, much admired by his devoted followers all over the world"; concerning his audio-book work, Finnish folklorist Henni Ilomäki wrote of his "practised enunciation [as] beautiful and clear." His career spanned over 30 years with the Corporation: he retired in 1993.

== Translations ==
=== Finnish ===
Bosley first encountered the Finnish language when he was given a Finnish-English dictionary by his uncle during his youth. Afterwards, he studied Finnish it with a grammar written in German. Finding William Forsell Kirby's 1907 translation of the Kalevala in a used bookstore, he became irritated by its lack of fluidity, and resolved to read the original Finnish.

As a translator, Bosley realised several books of Finnish folk poetry into English, as well as modern works: The Last Temptations by Joonas Kokkonen, Whitsongs by Eino Leino, and work by Aleksis Kivi as Odes. Over the course of several decades, Bosley translated and published the Kalevala, a 22,795-verse-long epic poem compiled and edited by Elias Lönnrot from the folk poetry of Karelia and Finland; the poem is Finland's national epic. In 1966, and again in 1971, Bosley published extracts of it for children, and two years later published the fourth canto under the title The Song of Aino. In 1977, folklorist Matti Kuusi and linguist Michael Branch, having seen these poetry translations, brought him to work together on a bilingual anthology of Finnish verse, which was released in 1977.

Bosley published some verses of the Kalevala in 1985, but a full version only appeared four years later: due to its older style and ideas, the text was more challenging to work on than others. Bosley wrote about his experiences in translating the work and his philosophy of translation in Taking the Rough with the Smooth, and an article, Translating the Kalevala: Midway Reflections. In these, he wrote of his responsibility as translator towards the text, and the importance of not introducing himself into the text, and thereby hindering connection with the original author. Thus, he stood against using more modern free metre and using modern phrasing. Bosley especially had issue with finding an appropriate metre - Finnish poetry uses metre constructed on a unit of syllables, whereas English-language poetry uses multi-syllable feet. However, he found using feet too flat, and so to find a natural-sounding metre drew on the cywydd of Middle Welsh poetry he had read as a child:

The only way I could devise of reflecting the vitality of Kalevala metre was to invent my own, based on syllables rather than feet… I eventually arrived at seven, five and nine syllables respectively, using the impair [sic] (odd number) as a formal device and letting the stresses fall where they would.

— Keith Bosley, The Kalevala, preface

The work took five years, with Bosley translating one hundred verses every night during shifts at the BBC. When published in the Oxford World's Classics series, it attracted praise from reviewers, especially for his metre. The edition saw reprints in 1990 and in 2008; after his wife suggested he make an audio-book version due to his skill in narration and experience with the text, he recorded and released an audio edition with Naxos in 2013. The audio-book spanned 12 CDs, with a duration of roughly thirteen and a half hours. In addition to the Kalevala, Bosley also rendered much of the Kanteletar, another less widely-known collection of Finnish verse by Lönnrot, into English. Here, he was the first to do so, publishing in 1992. A year later, he again worked with Branch, alongside Lauri Honko and Senni Timonen, to produce a large work of poetry from across the Finno-Ugric peoples and languages: this comprised over 30 poets, 450 poems, and 13 languages, including Veps, Mordvin, Udmurt, and Livonian.

== Personal life ==
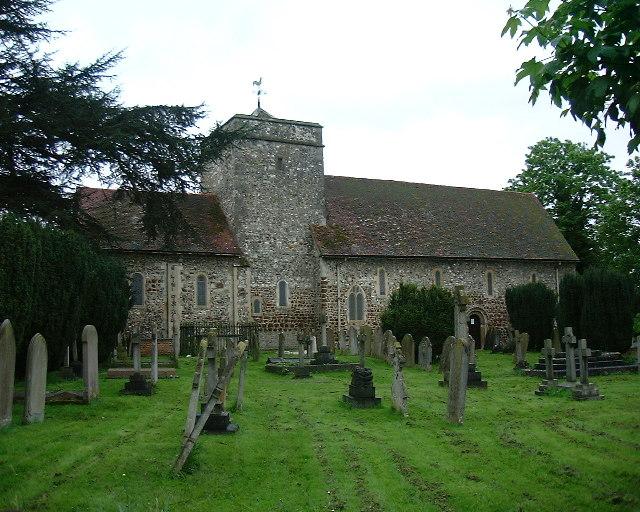
Bosley's church, St Laurence's Church, Upton-cum-Chalvey

Bosley was first married to vocalist Helen Sava, and with her had one son. In 1982, several years after concluding his partnership with Sava, he married harpist Satu Salo, and with her had two sons. Bosley played the pipe organ and piano, particularly enjoying the works of Johann Sebastian Bach. Starting public performance on the organ at sixteen, he was organist of his local church of St Laurence's Church, Upton-cum-Chalvey for over forty years, finishing in 2015. Bosley wrote a pamphlet about the location of the churchyard in Thomas Gray's Elegy Written in a Country Churchyard, in which he hypothesised that the titular location was that of St. Laurence's instead of at the nearby Church of St Giles, Stoke Poges.

On 24 June, 2018, Bosley died in a nursing home in Slough, aged 80, after a short illness.

=== Honours and awards ===
Ribbon bar of the Knight of the Order of the White Rose

In 1979, in recognition of the anthology published with Kuusen and Branch the two years before, Bosley was awarded the annual Finnish State Prize for Foreign Translators by FILI, with prize money of €15,000. In 1980, he was invited to become a corresponding member of the Finnish Literature Society, and the next year was made a Knight, First Class of the Order of the White Rose of Finland. In the United Kingdom, Bosley won prizes in competitions held by the English Goethe Society and British Comparative Literature Association.

== Publications ==
Poetry

- The Possibility of Angels (1969)
- And I Dance: for children (1972)
- Dark Summer (1976)
- Stations (1979)
- A Chiltern Hundred (1987)
- An Upton Hymnal (1999)
- The Wedding-Guest: selected poems (ed. Owen Lowery and Anthony Rudolf) (2018)

Translations

- Russia's Other Poets (1968)
- An Idiom of Night: Pierre Jean Jouve (1968)
- The War Wife: Vietnamese poetry (1972)
- The Song of Songs (1976)
- Finnish Folk Poetry: Epic (1977)
- Mallarmé: The Poems (1977)
- A Round O: André Frénaud (1977)
- The Last Temptations: opera by Joonas Kokkonen (1977)
- Whitsongs: Eino Leino (1978)
- The Elek Book of Oriental Verse (1979)
- A Reading of Ashes: Jerzy Ficowski (1981)
- From the Theorems of Master Jean de La Ceppède (1983)
- The Kalevala (1989)
- Luís de Camões: Epic and Lyric (1990)
- The Kanteletar: selection (1992)
- The Great Bear: Finno-Ugrian oral poetry (1993)
- Odes: Aleksis Kivi (1994)
- A Centenary Pessoa (1995)
- Rome the Sorceress: André Frénaud (1995)
- Eve Blossom Has Wheels: German love poetry (1997)
- Skating on the Sea: poetry from Finland (1997)

Audiobooks

- The Kalevala (2013) – an audio recording of the 1989 translation
