= Mulkkusaaret =

Island group in Finland

Coordinates: 64°22′10″N 27°42′35″E

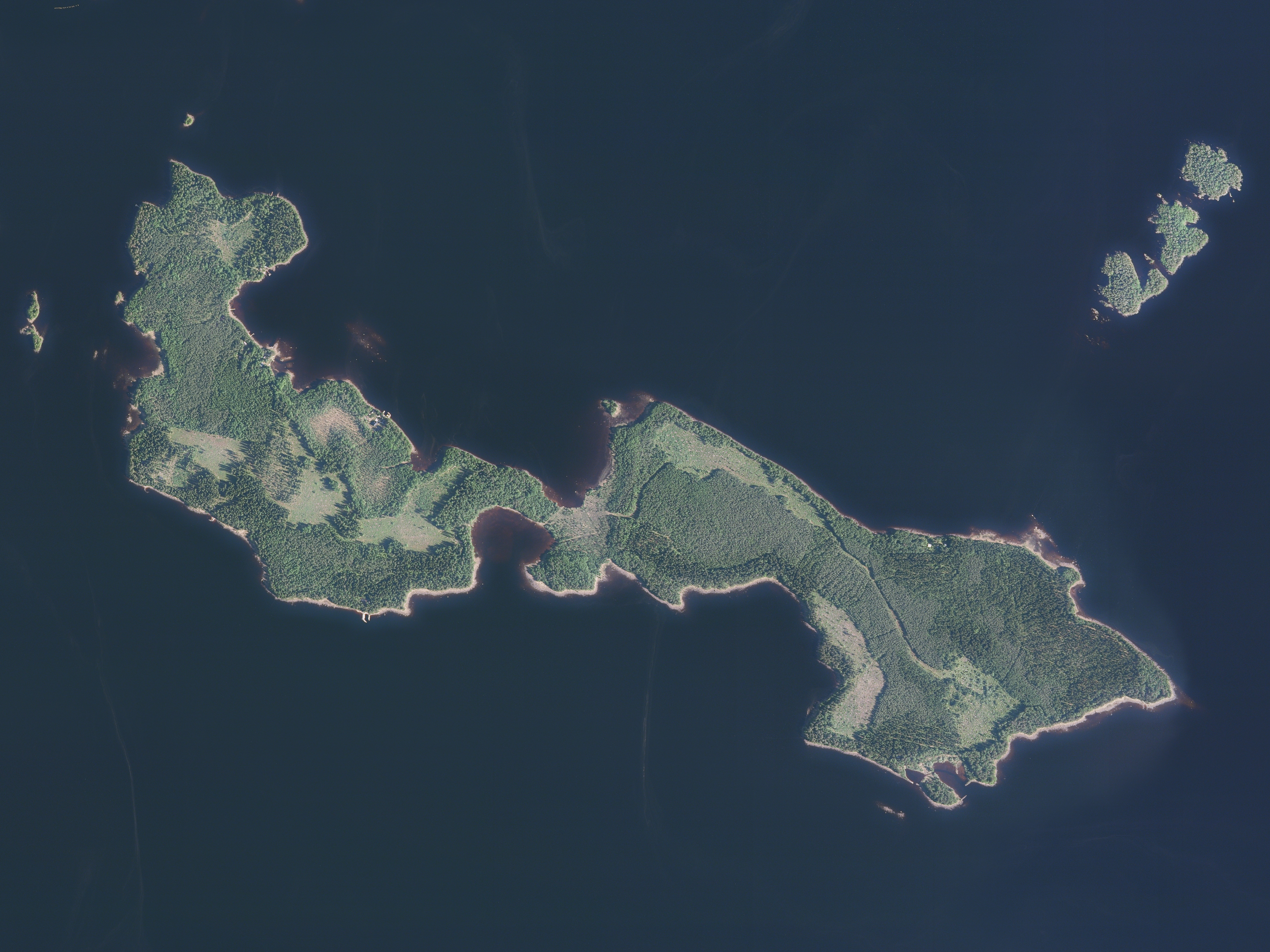
Tevä island, with Mulkkusaaret islands in the top right

Mulkkusaaret (literally translates to Dick Islands or Penis Islands) is a group of three small islands and one rock in lake Oulujärvi in the Paltamo municipality in Finland. The islands are located north of Tevä island, approximately 5 kilometers (3.1 mi) south-southwest from Melalahti village and approximately 9 kilometers (5.6 mi) north-northwest from Paltaniemi village.

The islands form a chain in northeast-southwest direction, and are mostly covered by boreal forests. Open cliff coasts can be found on all three islands, mainly on the south sides. There is a campfire site and a shelter, laavu, on the southernmost island.
