= Manamansalo =

Island in the country of Finland

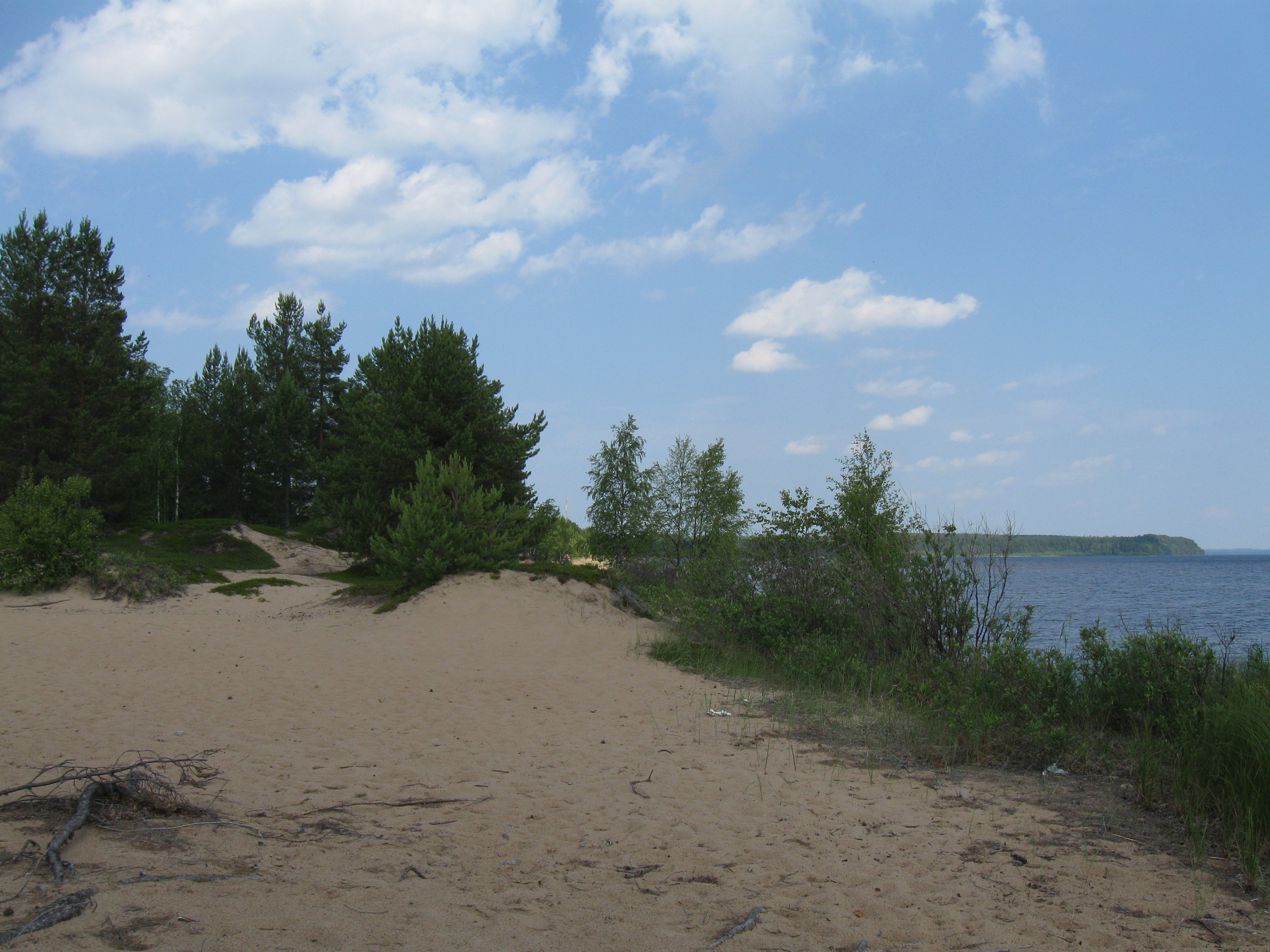
- Kultahiekat beach

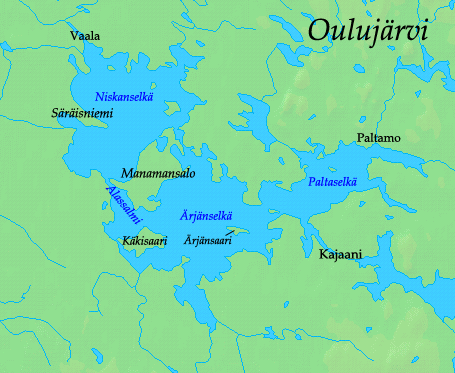
- Map of Oulujärvi showing Manamansalo

Geography
- Coordinates: 64.3592527°N 27.0607030°E
- Area: 76 km^{2} (29 sq mi)

Administration
- Finland
- Lake: Oulujärvi
- Municipalities: Vaala

Demographics
- Languages: Finnish

Manamansalo is the largest island in the Oulujärvi, the fifth largest lake in Finland. Administratively it belongs to the Vaala municipality in North Ostrobothnia, or Kainuu until 2016. It is the seventh largest inland island in Finland, or the fifth largest if Soisalo and Sääminginsalo are not counted as islands.

== Geography ==
Manamansalo is located between the Ärjänselkä and Niskanselkä areas (fjards) of Oulujärvi.

The main village on the island is also known as Manamansalo. Other villages include Puronranta and Unelanperä.

The road 8820 (Manamansalontie) goes through the island. The northeastern part has a bridge connected to the mainland, but crossing the Alassalmi strait in the southwest has to be done via the Alassalmi Ferry.

== History ==
Manamansalo was settled by Finns in the 16th century. It was first mentioned in 1555 as a part of the Liminka parish. The name Manamansalo means roughly "forested island of death", suggesting that it was used by huntsmen as a burial island.

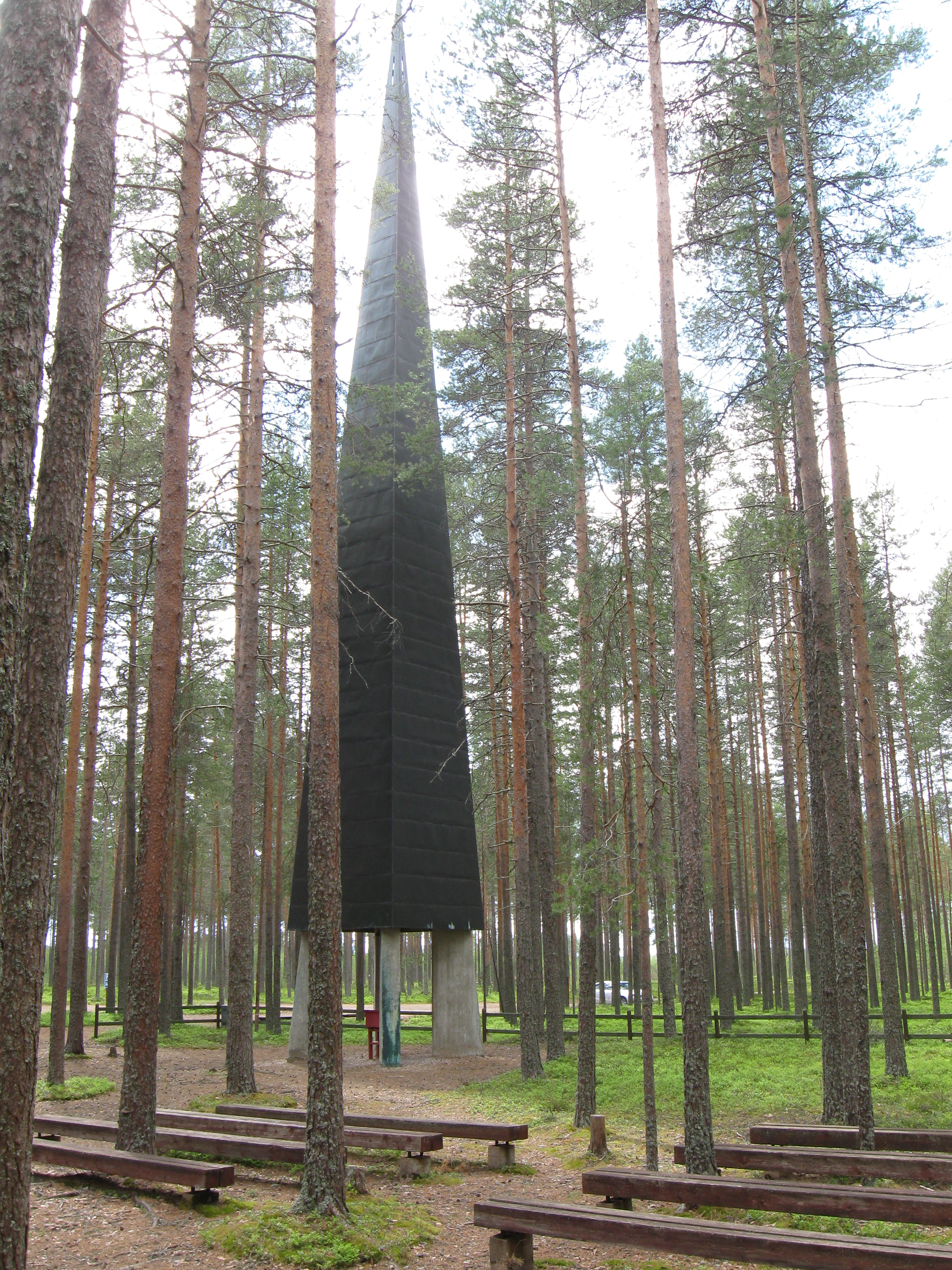
The memorial open-air church.

The first church in all of Kainuu was built on Manamansalo in 1559. It became the center of the Oulujärvi parish, separated from Liminka on that year. The church was destroyed by Russians in 1581, after which the Oulujärvi parish was reintegrated into Liminka. A new church was built in Paltaniemi in 1599, after which the reestablished parish was known as Paltamo. Manamansalo remained part of Paltamo until Säräisniemi was separated from it in 1864. The Säräisniemi municipality was renamed Vaala in 1954 after its seat was moved from the village of Säräisniemi to the village of Vaala.

An open-air church was built on the island in 1959 in commemoration of the 400th anniversary of the original church. It is located on the same site as the 16th century church.

The bell of the 16th century church was found in the Solovetsky Monastery of Russia in the 1970s, having been brought there in 1596.
