= Eino Leino (statue) =

Statue in Helsinki, Finland

Coordinates: 60°10′03.252″N 24°56′42.824″E

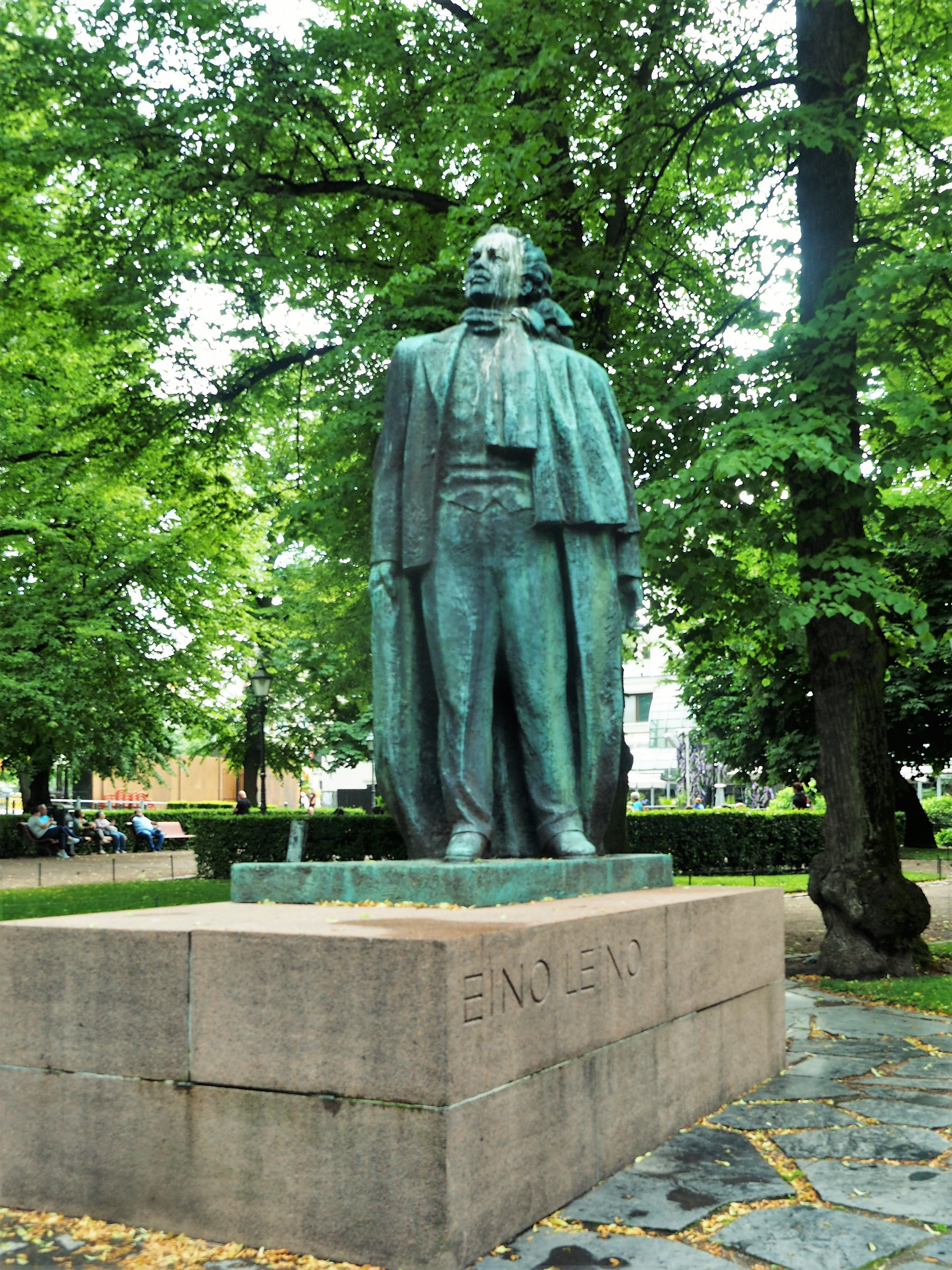
Statue of the Finnish poet in the Esplanadi Park.

The Eino Leino is a statue of Eino Leino (1878–1926) sculpted by Lauri Leppänen in the Esplanadi Park in Helsinki, Finland. It is located in the northeast corner of Teatteriesplanadi, close to the intersection of the Pohjoisesplanadi and Mikonkatu streets.

The statue was unveiled on September 26, 1953, the 63rd anniversary of Leino's publication of his first poem in Hämeen Sanomat. The Eino Leino Society, the Finnish Cultural Foundation and the publishing company Otava had declared a memorial competition in 1948, which was decided in 1951 in the second round in favor of Leppänen. Leppänen had personally known Leino while he was alive. Leppänen hoped to place the statue in Taka-Töölö on the corner of the Eino Leinon katu and Topeliuksenkatu streets, but it was placed on the Esplanade. Arvo Turtiainen wrote a poem about the statues in the Esplanadi Park, in which he lamented that Leino was placed halfway between the two restaurants and still spoke to Taru ja Totuus, the girls statue owned for Zachris Topelius.

The statue with its pedestal is 4.2 metres (14 ft) high. Engraved on the pedestal of the statue is a verse from Leino's poem Väinämöinen's Song: "One is a song above the others: a harsh song of the spirit of the human ideology". An interesting detail in the statue is its hand, into which a five-mark coin was inserted when it was cast. This is related to the story that Leino stated in his life that he "is not poor as long as he has a mark on his hand".
