= Kivesjärvi (village) =

Village in Paltamo, Finland

Coordinates: 64°28′10″N 27°27′49″E

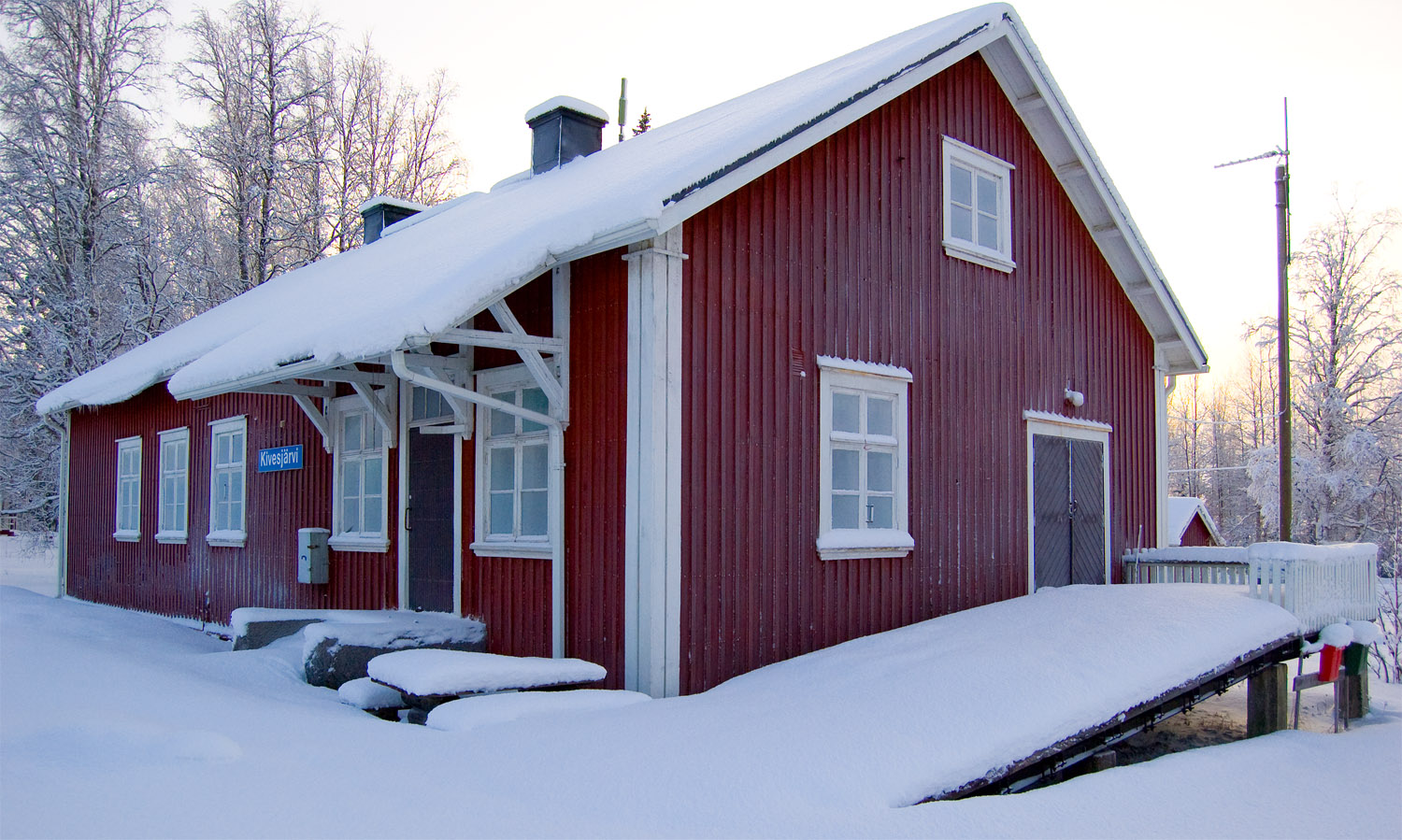
Kivesjärvi railway station in February 2008.

Kivesjärvi (literally Testicle Lake in English) is a village of about 80 people in Paltamo municipality in Finland. The village is named after the nearby Lake Kivesjärvi. The village is located next to the Oulu–Kontiomäki railway line and the Highway 22. There is no passenger service at the Kivesjärvi railway station.
