= Tytti =

Tytti is a given name. Notable people with the name include:

- Tytti Isohookana-Asunmaa (born 1947), Finnish politician
- Tytti Seppänen (born 1980), Finnish politician
- Tytti Tuppurainen (born 1976), Finnish politician
