= Kalle Korhonen =

Finnish politician (1878–1938)

- Карл Корхонен

Member of the Parliament of Finland
- In office 4 April 1917 – 25 September 1918
- Constituency: Oulu Province South

Personal details
- Born: Kaarlo Eeronpoika Korhonen; 27 December 1878 Veneheitto, Säräisniemi, Russian Empire
- Died: 11 February 1938 (aged 59) Karhumäki, Soviet Union
- Party: Social Democratic Party of Finland
- Occupation: Farmer

Kaarlo (Kalle) Eeronpoika Korhonen (Russian: Карл Эрикович Корхонен, romanized: Karl Erikovic Korxonen; 27 December 1878 – 11 February 1938) was a Finnish farmer, politician and member of the Parliament of Finland, the national legislature of Finland. A member of the Social Democratic Party, he represented Oulu Province South between April 1917 and September 1918. Korhonen went to Soviet Russia during the Finnish Civil War and was executed there in 1938 during Stalin's Great Purge.

== Early life ==
Korhonen was born on 27 (Note: Another sources give Korhonen's date of birth as 26 December 1878.) December 1878 in Veneheitto in Säräisniemi municipality in central Grand Duchy of Finland. After attending public school, he worked as a wheelwright and a labourer. He was a farmer in Säräisniemi.

== Politics and civil war ==
Korhonen joined the Social Democratic Party (SDP) in 1902 and was chairman of the party's local branch. He was elected to the Parliament of Finland at the 1916 parliamentary election. He was re-elected at the 1917 parliamentary election.

During the Finnish Civil War Korhonen was sent to Petrograd as part of a people's delegation. After the Reds were defeated Korhonen remained in Soviet Russia.

== Exile and death ==
Korhonen was chairman of the Airo commune in Kostroma in the Volga region. He was sent to Karelia in June 1920 where he worked as a raftsman on the Sunu river, as a railway guard in Kemi and in the land affairs department of the Uhtua District (Kalevalsky District) administration. He was a manager of financial affairs at a youth school (1923-1930), a director of the financial department of the Uhtua state farm (1930-1933), school director (1932-1936) and a worker of the Municipal Department of the Uhtua District Executive Committee (1936).

Korhonen was a member of the Russian Communist Party (Bolsheviks) from 1918 to 1936. With the onset of Stalin's Great Purge, Korhonen was expelled from the party on 26 November 1935 by the Kalevala district committee. He was imprisoned on 30 November 1937 for counter-revolutionary activities and on 21 January 1938 sentenced to death by shooting. He was executed on 11 February 1938 in the foothills of Karhumäki (Medvezhyegorsk). He was posthumously rehabilitated in September 1988.

== Personal life ==
Korhonen was married to Hilma (Hilda) and had an adopted daughter, Silvia Thorstensson. Later he married Soviet citizen Anna and lived in Uhtua (Kalevala) in Russian Karelia. They had a son, Taisto.

== See also ==
- List of Finnish MPs imprisoned for political reasons
