= St Laurence's Church, Upton-cum-Chalvey =

Church of Saint Laurence, Upton-cum-Chalvey
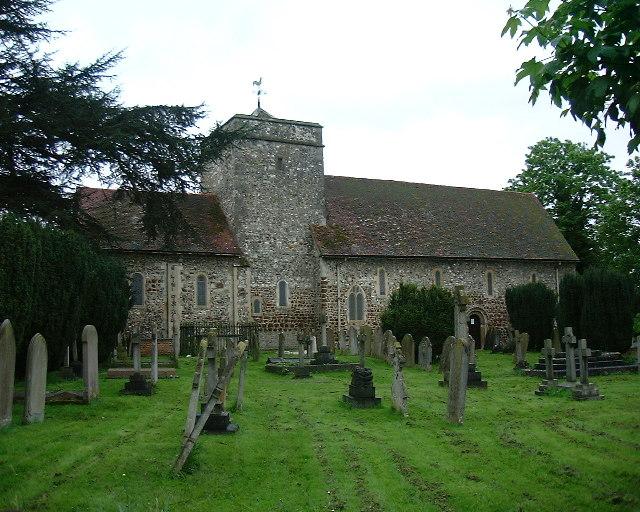

- Location in Berkshire
- 51.5023°N 0.5884°W
- Location: Upton Court Road, Slough SL3 7LS
- Country: England
- Denomination: Church of England
- Churchmanship: Liberal Anglo-Catholic
- Website: Saint Laurence's Church

History
- Founded: 12th century

Administration
- Province: Canterbury
- Diocese: Oxford
- Deanery: Burnham and Slough
- Parish: Upton-cum-Chalvey

Clergy
- Rector: Andrew Allen

Saint Laurence's Church is one of three Church of England parish churches in the benefice of Upton-cum-Chalvey, and is the oldest building in the borough of Slough, in Berkshire, England.

In the 12th century the wooden parish church of Upton was replaced with a flint building. The tower and outside walls of the Norman building form part of the present church. Several of the walls are built of puddingstone. Two other Norman features survive: the ancient baptismal font and a piscina. In the English Reformation many of the ancient decorations were mutilated. A 13th-century Italian allegorical image of the Trinity – God Father, Son and Holy Spirit – survived and was reassembled in the restoration of the church.

== Dereliction and restoration ==
By the early 19th century St Laurence's had fallen into such disrepair that it was decided to build a new church, St Mary's, in the town centre. The Norman building was saved from demolition by a local farmer who secured the outside walls and tower. Saint Laurence's was restored in 1850–51 by Benjamin Ferrey and rededicated on 2 December 1851.

== Notable associations with the church ==
The churchyard may have inspired the 1751 Elegy Written in a Country Churchyard by local poet Thomas Gray (1716–71). St Laurence's "ivy-mantled tow’r" was a well-known landmark housing a curfew bell that "tolls the knell of parting day" across the fields of Eton College.

The astronomer and composer Sir William Herschel (1738–1822), discoverer of Uranus, is buried at St Laurence's. He, his wife and his grandson are all interred in a family vault at the base of the tower, and there are commemorative plaques on the wall nearby. In 2001 a generous bequest allowed St Laurence's to install a set of stained-glass windows to commemorate Herschel and his discovery.

The west window of the church is a memorial to John Sullivan (1788–1855), who is buried in the churchyard. He was the Collector of Coimbatore, India, between 1815 and 1830, and is best known as the founder of the city of Ooty. Charles Hatchett (1765–1847), discoverer of the element niobium, is also buried here.

The poet and translator Keith Bosley was the church organist for many years.
