= Chess (Madetoja) =

Incidental music by Leevi Madetoja

- Incidental music by Leevi Madetoja
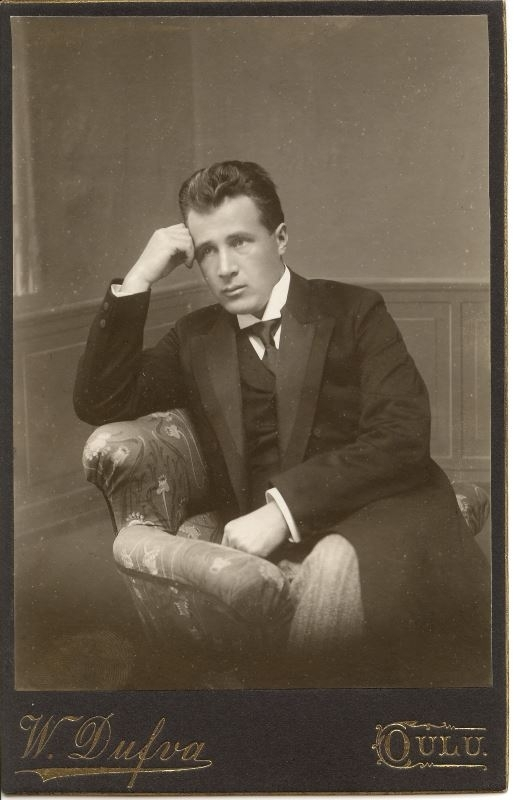
- The composer (c. 1908)
- Native name: Shakkipeli
- Opus: 5
- Text: Shakkipeli by Eino Leino
- Composed: 1910
- Duration: Approx. 16 mins.

Premiere
- Date: 15 February 1910
- Location: Helsinki, Grand Duchy of Finland
- Conductor: Leevi Madetoja
- Performers: Apostol's Concert Orchestra

Chess (in Finnish: Shakkipeli; literal translation: 'Chess Game'), (Note: The liner notes to the world premiere recording of Chess, by Arvo Volmer and the Oulu Symphony Orchestra for Alba, refers to the composition as the Chess Suite (Finnish: Shakkipelisarja), in four movements. However, the newspaper reviews from the premiere in February 1910 clearly indicate that Madetoja wrote four movements, only. Because the term 'suite' often is reserved—in the context of works for theatre—to indicate the excerption and arrangement of shorter pieces from a longer score, this article drops 'suite' ('sarja') from the composition's name.) Op. 5, is a theatre score—comprising four numbers—for orchestra by the Finnish composer Leevi Madetoja; he wrote the music in 1910 to accompany the Finnish author Eino Leino's one-act "historical tableau" (Note: The original Finnish is: "historiallinen kuvaelma"; the original Swedish is: "historisk tablå".) of the same name. In particular, Madetoja's music occurs during the pantomime divertissement in the middle of the play. The scene, a dream sequence in which 16 white and 16 black chess pieces come to life and play a game, is an allegory for the political intrigue that transpired in 1464 between rivals for the Swedish thrown: Charles VIII of Sweden and Christian I of Denmark. Chess premiered on 15 February 1910 in Helsinki at Finnish National Theatre during a lottery soirée, with Madetoja conducting the Apostol's Concert Orchestra.

== History ==
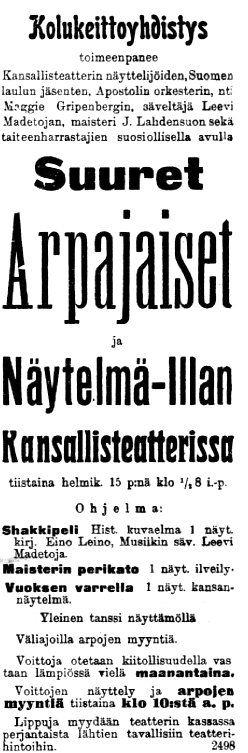
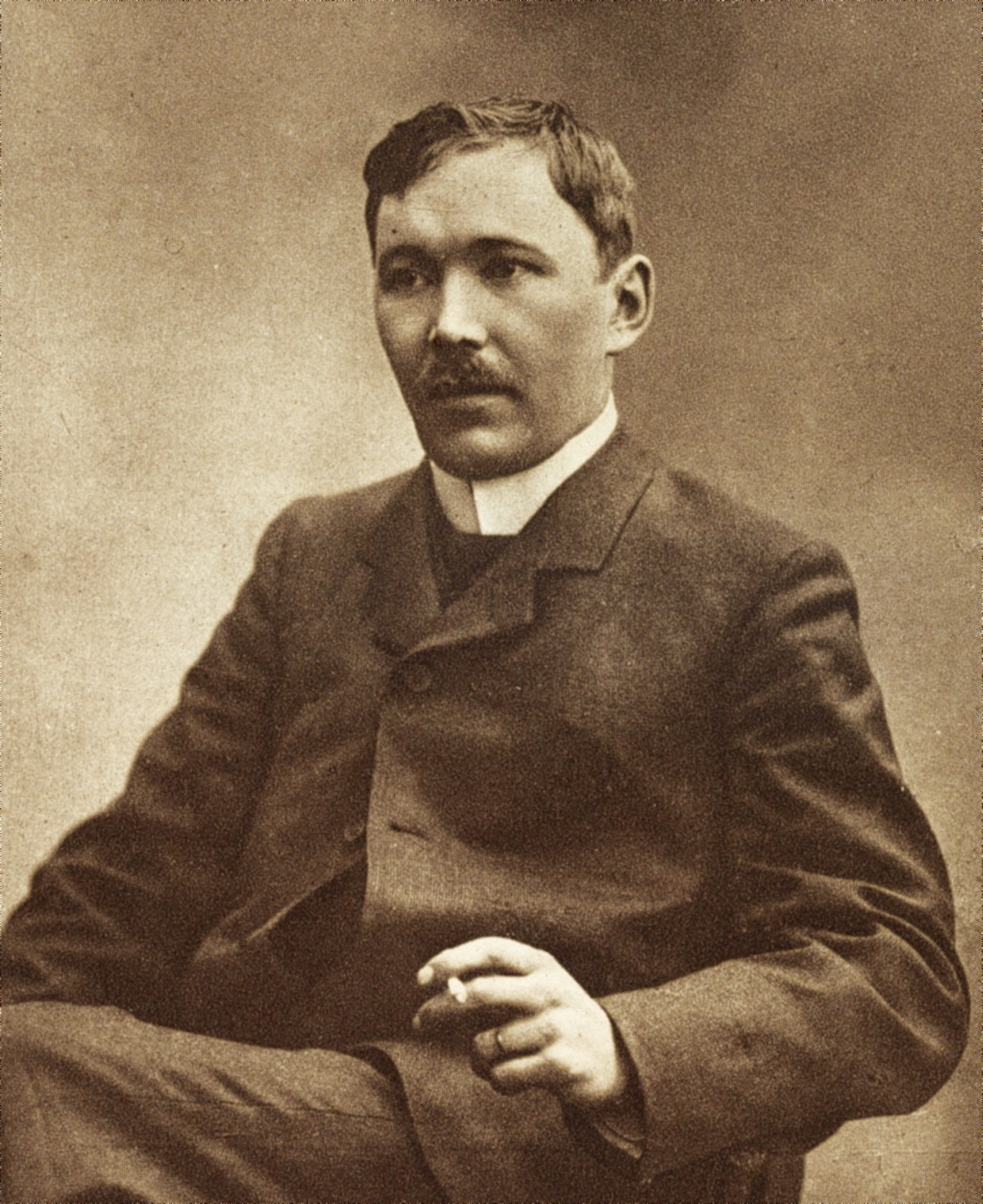
The Finnish author Eino Leino (right), who was an avid chess player, wrote the one-act play Shakkipeli in 1909.

Chess premiered on 15 February 1910 in Helsinki at Finnish National Theatre. The occasion was a lottery soirée organized by the Association for Feeding Elementary School Children. (Note: The original Finnish is: Kolukeittoyhdistys; the original Swedish is: Föreningen för bespisning af folkskolebarn) As the musicologist Glenda Dawn Goss has written about turn-of-the-century Finland, such charitable evenings were common:

The faintly distasteful act of giving money to gamble for prizes was masked by the elaborate spectacle ... which proved to be an ideal device for raising money in support of national causes and ... promoting social cohesion and Finnish identity in a guise that the imperial censors would approve ... These entertainments ... with music, drama, dancing, drinking, and eating mingled with the fund-raising ... [comprised] lavish tableaux vivants in which key events from Finland's myths, landscapes, and history were colorfully dramatized ... Choruses, orchestras, and other musicians were brought to sing, play dance music, and perform new works, which the country's composers were prevailed upon to compose ... The very spectacle was enough to take one's breath away.

The soirée opened with the Apostol's Concert Orchestra playing the overture from the opera The Merry Wives of Windsor (1849) by the German composer Otto Nicolai. After this, the program included three short one-act stage works, the first of which was Leino's historical tableau Chess; Madetoja's incidental music, which he conducted and the Apostol performed, accompanied the pantomime divertissement (including dances choreographed by Maggie Gripenberg) in the middle of the play. The finale of Chess included an additional musical number, albeit not by Madetoja: Jesu dulcis memoria a Christian hymn attributed to Saint Bernard of Clairvaux, which was sung backstage by the 40-member mixed choir Suomen Laulu. (Note: The remaining two plays were the farce Maisterin perikato (The Master's Legacy) by Nuutti Vuoritsalo and the folk play Vuoksen varrella (Along the River) by Martti Wuori. The evening concluded with a general dance for the public. Lottery tickets for the charitable cause were sold during the intermissions.) The next day, Hufvudstadsbladet characterized the score by "our promising young composer Leevi Madetoja" as "appealing and beautiful", while and Uusi Suometar described its as "rich in atmosphere".

Additional praise followed Madetoja's first composition concert in Helsinki on 26 September 1910, at which he conducted the Piano Trio and excerpts from the Symphonic Suite and Chess. For example, Martin Wegelius wrote in Helsingin Sanomat: "Rarely it is possible to return from a first-timer's concert with such great feelings of satisfaction. Indeed very few of us Finns are equipped with such extensive spiritual gifts, that he is able to 'break through' with those so quickly, to conquer the audience in only one evening. Leevi Madetoja did it yesterday and did it in a way which can only be called unique." The positive reviews did, however, contain a note of concern: given Madetoja's plans to travel to Paris for additional education, the critic Evert Katila of Uusi Suometar worried about the negative influence "French modern atonal composition" could have on "this fresh northern nature [Madetoja]".

== Structure and roles ==
Leino's play is in one act; a pantomime divertissement occurs in the middle, during which Madetoja's music is played. As such, the only characters that interact with his score are the 32 chess pieces that the protagonist, Niilo Olavinpoika, has dreamt to life. The score lasts about 16 minutes.

Roles	Description	Premiere cast (2 February 1910)
Niilo Olavinpoika	Lord of Särkilahti, chess player	[unknown]
Dominus Bartholomaeus	Chess player (non-speaking role)	[unknown]
Kuolema	The personification of Death (non-speaking role)	[unknown]
Kirves	Olavinpoika's friend	[unknown]
Chess pieces [4 rooks, 4 knights, 4 bishops, 2 kings, 2 queens, 16 pawns (young men and ladies)]

1. Juhlamarssi (Festive March)
2. Kansankarkelo (Frolic of the People) (Note: The liner notes to the Alba recording of Chess translates No. II was "Revel".)^{[is this literal translation correct?]}
3. Miekkatanssi (Sword Dance)
4. Minuetto (Minuet)

== Discography ==
Chess has been recorded commercially just once:

Conductor	Orchestra	Rec. (Note: Refers to the year in which the performers recorded the work; this may not be the same as the year in which the recording was first released to the general public.)	Time	Recording venue	Label	Ref.
Arvo Volmer	Oulu Symphony Orchestra	2000	15:43	Madetoja Hall, Oulu Music Centre	Alba	(Note: A. Volmer–Alba (ABCD 162) 2002)

== Notes, references, and sources ==
=== Sources ===
- "Lotteri och soaré" [Lottery and soirée]. Hufvudstadsbladet (in Swedish). No. 44. 15 February 1910. p. 5.
- "Lotteri och soaré" [Lottery and soirée]. Hufvudstadsbladet (in Swedish). No. 45. 16 February 1910. p. 5.
- "Koulukeittoyhdistyksen arpajaiset ja näytelmä-ilta" [The Association for Feeding Elementary School Children's lottery and evening of plays]. Uusi Suometar (in Finnish). No. 37. 16 February 1910. p. 3.
- Goss, Glenda Dawn (2009). Sibelius: A Composer's Life and the Awakening of Finland. Chicago: University of Chicago Press. ISBN 978-0-226-00547-8.
- Pulliainen, Riitta (2001). Madetoja Orchestral Works, Vol. 4: Laurel Wreaths (booklet). Arvo Volmer & Oulu Symphony Orchestra. Alba. p. 4–8. ABCD 162.
