= Kajaani Airport =

Kajaani Airport Kajaanin lentoasema

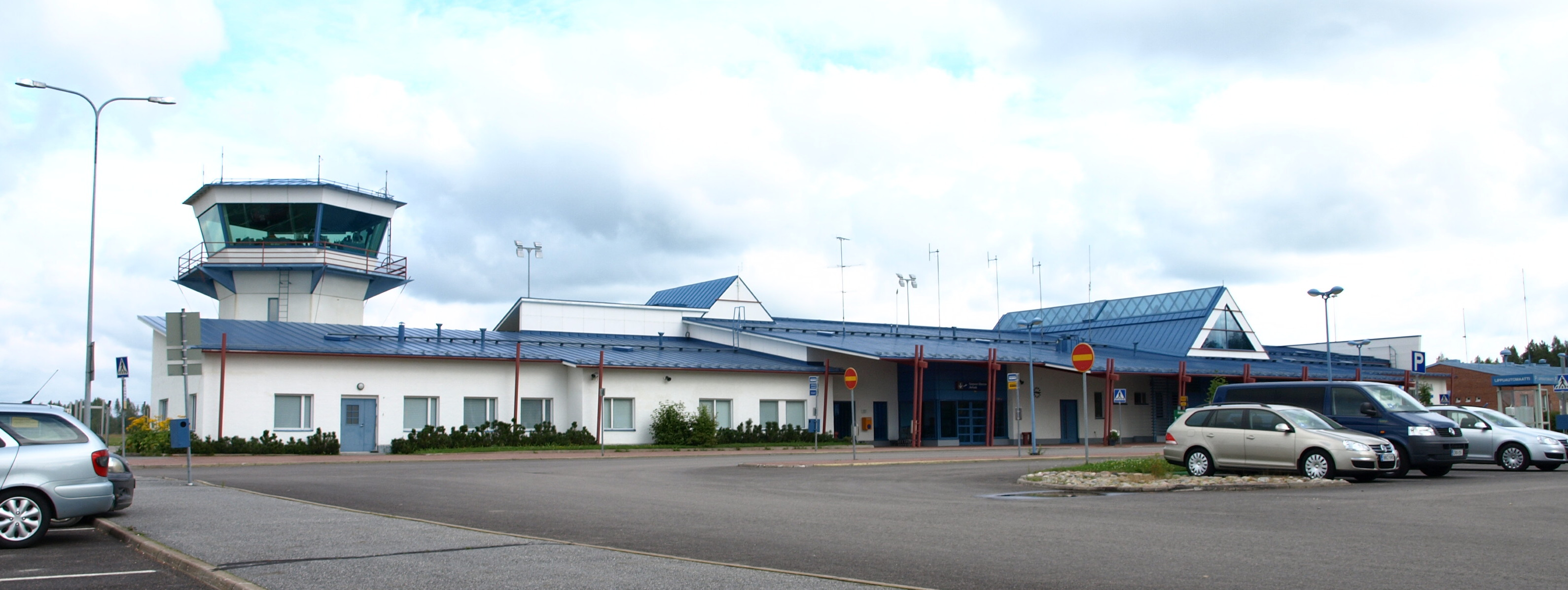
- IATA: KAJ; ICAO: EFKI

Summary
- Airport type: Public
- Operator: Finavia
- Location: Paltaniemi, Kajaani, Finland
- Elevation AMSL: 483 ft (147 m)
- Coordinates: 64°17′03″N 027°41′15″E
- Website: finavia.fi

Map
- Location within Finland

Runways
Direction	Length		Surface
Direction	ft	m	Surface
07/25	8,199	2,500	Asphalt

Statistics (2018)
- Passengers: 88,815
- Landings: 1 093
- Source: AIP Finland; Statistics from Finavia

Kajaani Airport (IATA: KAJ, ICAO: EFKI) is an airport in Paltaniemi, Kajaani, Finland, approximately 7 kilometres (4 mi) northwest of Kajaani city centre.

== History ==
Construction of the airport began in 1939 with the runway being completed in the autumn. However, because of the outbreak of World War II it would not be until the 22 June 1956 that the airport would be officially opened.

== Airlines and destinations ==
The following airlines operate regular scheduled and charter flights at Kajaani Airport:

Airlines	Destinations
Discover Airlines	Seasonal: Frankfurt (begins 17 December 2027)
Finnair	Helsinki
TUI Airways	Seasonal: Manchester
TUI fly Netherlands	Seasonal: Amsterdam

== Statistics ==
Annual passenger statistics for Kajaani Airport
Year	Domestic passengers	International passengers	Total passengers	Change
2005	93,470	5,985	99,455	−4.4% ▼
2006	87,273	5,464	92,737	−6.8% ▼
2007	87,061	3,741	90,802	−2.1% ▼
2008	81,243	3,366	84,609	−6.8% ▼
2009	70,848	2,552	73,400	−13.3% ▼
2010	63,980	2,033	66,013	−10.1% ▼
2011	74,985	3,110	78,095	+18.3% ▲
2012	70,369	7,483	77,852	−0.3% ▼
2013	69,817	4,741	74,558	−4.2% ▼
2014	67,981	3,873	71,854	−3.6% ▼
2015	81,096	2,933	84,029	+16.9% ▲
2016	84,160	1,693	85,853	+2.2% ▲
2017	84,724	2,731	87,455	+1.9% ▲
2018	85,286	3,529	88,815	+1,6% ▲
2019	84,316	2,991	87,307	−1.7% ▼
2020	16,924	455	17,379	−80.1% ▼
2021	17,583	17	17,600	+1.3% ▲
2022	24,537	863	25,400	+44.3% ▲
2023	39,377	1,143	40,520	+59.5% ▲
2024	38,282	1,479	39,761	−1.9% ▼
2025	40,408	2,708	43,116	+8.4% ▲

== Awards ==
The airport was Finavia airport of the year in 1994, 1997 and 2007.

== Ground transportation ==
Means of transport at Kajaani Airport
Means of transport	Operator	Route	Destinations	Website	Notes
Bus	Kajaani Local Traffic	4	Kajaani Market Square (Finnish: Kauppatori)		On rush hours
Bus	A. Kyllönen Oy	Airbus	Sotkamo bus station (via Kajaani Market Square and Vuokatti)		According to flight schedules

== See also ==
- List of the largest airports in the Nordic countries
