= Vaala =

- Municipality
- Vaalan kunta Vaala kommun
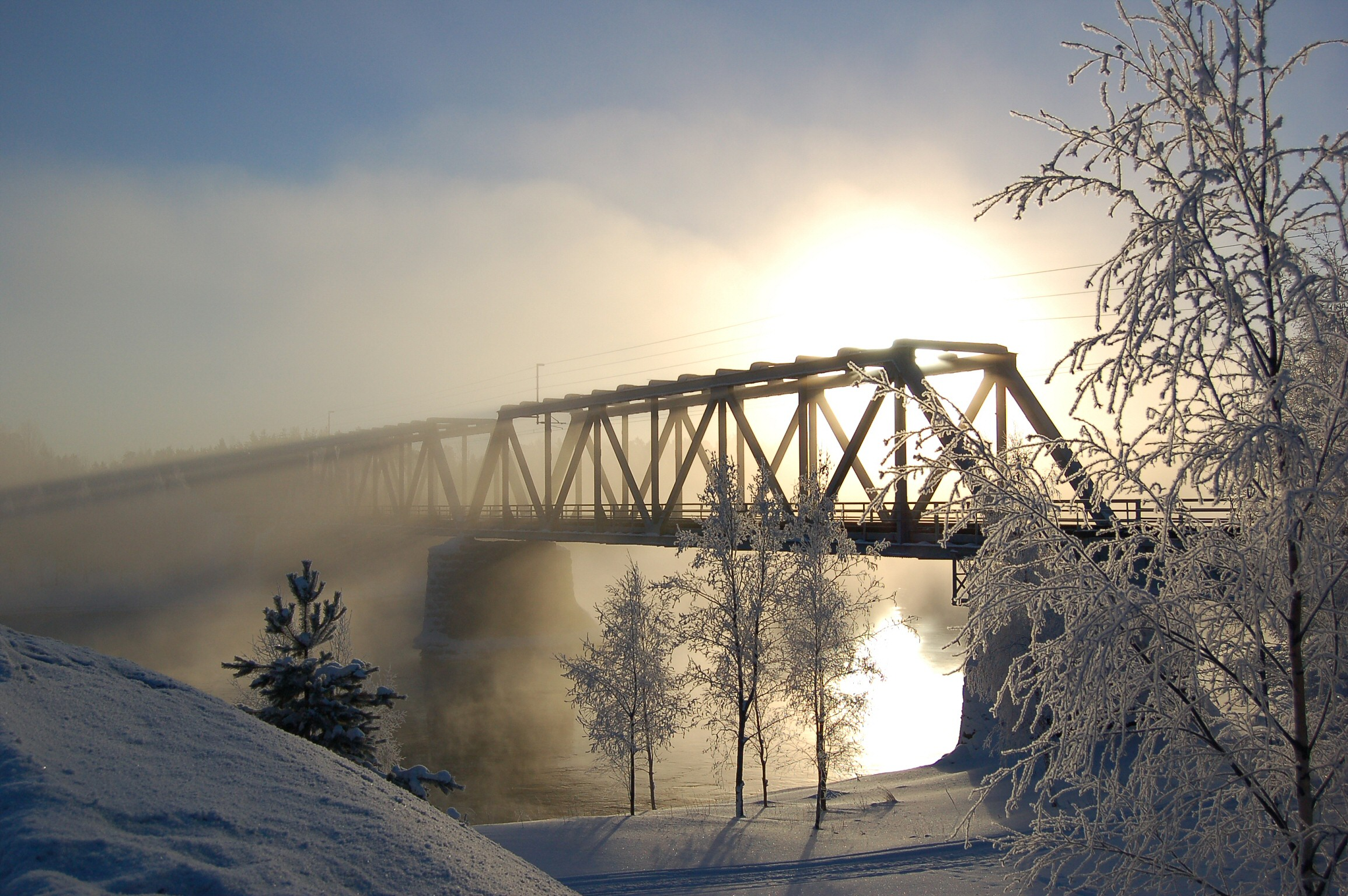
- Mist rising from Oulujoki river in Vaala

- Coat of arms

- Location of Vaala in Finland
- Interactive map of Vaala
- Coordinates: 64°33′N 026°50′E
- Country: Finland
- Region: North Ostrobothnia
- Sub-region: Oulunkaari
- Charter: 1954
- Seat: Säräisniemi (1865–1954); Vaala (1954–)

Government
  - Municipality manager: Tytti Seppänen

Area (2018-01-01)
  - Total: 1,764.04 km^{2} (681.10 sq mi)
  - Land: 1,302.37 km^{2} (502.85 sq mi)
  - Water: 461.45 km^{2} (178.17 sq mi)
  - Rank: 54th largest in Finland

Population (2025-12-31)
  - Total: 2,544
  - Rank: 232nd largest in Finland
  - Density: 1.95/km^{2} (5.1/sq mi)

Population by native language
  - Finnish: 98.1% (official)
  - Others: 1.9%

Population by age
  - 0 to 14: 11.1%
  - 15 to 64: 51.4%
  - 65 or older: 37.4%
- Time zone: UTC+02:00 (EET)
  - Summer (DST): UTC+03:00 (EEST)
- Website: www.vaala.fi

Vaala (Finnish pronunciation: [ˈʋɑːlɑ]) is a municipality in Finland. It is located in the North Ostrobothnia region. Established in 1954 (predecessor municipality Säräisniemi, established in 1867), the municipality has a population of 2,544 (31 December 2025) and covers an area of 1,764.04 square kilometres (681.10 sq mi) of which 461.45 km^{2} (178.17 sq mi) is water. The population density is 1.95 inhabitants per square kilometre (5.1/sq mi). Previously Vaala was part of the Kainuu region but was transferred to Northern Ostrobothnia on 1 January 2016. The municipality is unilingually Finnish.

Half of Oulujärvi, the fifth largest lake of Finland is located in Vaala. Vaala is also an old Finnish word, which means the phase in a river just before rapids.

Google is planning a data center to be located in Vaala.

== History ==
The original center of the area was Manamansalo, the largest island in the Oulujärvi with a village by the same name. Both it and Säräisniemi were first mentioned in 1555 when they were parts of the large Liminka parish. The parish of Oulujärvi, covering all of Kainuu with its center in Manamansalo, was separated from Liminka in 1559, but merged back into Liminka in the 1580s after Russians raided the island. In 1599, the area became a parish again, this time with its center in Paltaniemi, due to which the parish was now known as Paltamo.

Säräisniemi acquired its own church under Paltamo in 1779 and became a separate parish and municipality in 1864. Vuolijoki was separated from Säräisniemi as a parish in 1896 and as a municipality in 1915. Some parts of Kajaanin maalaiskunta were also used in the municipality's formation. The village of Vaala was transferred from Utajärvi to Säräisniemi in 1954, becoming the new administrative center of the municipality. The municipality itself was also renamed Vaala in the process.

Vaala was transferred from Kainuu to North Ostrobothnia in 2016.

== Climate ==
Climate data for Vaala Pelso (normals 1991-2020, extremes 1959-present)
Month	Jan	Feb	Mar	Apr	May	Jun	Jul	Aug	Sep	Oct	Nov	Dec	Year
Record high °C (°F)	8.3 (46.9)	8.4 (47.1)	13.4 (56.1)	22.3 (72.1)	28.4 (83.1)	30.9 (87.6)	33.0 (91.4)	30.5 (86.9)	25.0 (77.0)	19.9 (67.8)	10.5 (50.9)	7.2 (45.0)	33.0 (91.4)
Mean maximum °C (°F)	2.4 (36.3)	3.0 (37.4)	7.0 (44.6)	15.1 (59.2)	23.5 (74.3)	25.9 (78.6)	27.5 (81.5)	25.6 (78.1)	19.8 (67.6)	11.9 (53.4)	6.7 (44.1)	3.2 (37.8)	28.4 (83.1)
Mean daily maximum °C (°F)	−5.8 (21.6)	−5.4 (22.3)	−0.3 (31.5)	6.1 (43.0)	13.5 (56.3)	18.4 (65.1)	21.2 (70.2)	18.8 (65.8)	13.0 (55.4)	5.2 (41.4)	−0.2 (31.6)	−3.4 (25.9)	6.8 (44.2)
Daily mean °C (°F)	−9.2 (15.4)	−9.4 (15.1)	−5.1 (22.8)	1.2 (34.2)	7.8 (46.0)	13.0 (55.4)	15.7 (60.3)	13.5 (56.3)	8.3 (46.9)	2.4 (36.3)	−2.3 (27.9)	−6.1 (21.0)	2.5 (36.5)
Mean daily minimum °C (°F)	−13.5 (7.7)	−14.0 (6.8)	−10.1 (13.8)	−3.6 (25.5)	1.8 (35.2)	6.8 (44.2)	9.9 (49.8)	8.0 (46.4)	3.8 (38.8)	−0.6 (30.9)	−5.2 (22.6)	−9.8 (14.4)	−2.2 (28.0)
Mean minimum °C (°F)	−29.8 (−21.6)	−29.5 (−21.1)	−24.6 (−12.3)	−14.8 (5.4)	−5.4 (22.3)	−0.8 (30.6)	2.1 (35.8)	−0.3 (31.5)	−4.6 (23.7)	−12.0 (10.4)	−18.3 (−0.9)	−25.1 (−13.2)	−32.4 (−26.3)
Record low °C (°F)	−41.7 (−43.1)	−42.1 (−43.8)	−36.8 (−34.2)	−23.4 (−10.1)	−11.3 (11.7)	−4.3 (24.3)	−1.2 (29.8)	−4.1 (24.6)	−11.4 (11.5)	−26.1 (−15.0)	−36.5 (−33.7)	−35.0 (−31.0)	−42.1 (−43.8)
Average precipitation mm (inches)	36 (1.4)	30 (1.2)	30 (1.2)	27 (1.1)	51 (2.0)	69 (2.7)	89 (3.5)	69 (2.7)	60 (2.4)	59 (2.3)	51 (2.0)	44 (1.7)	614 (24.2)
Average precipitation days (≥ 1.0 mm)	10	8	8	7	9	11	12	10	10	12	12	11	120
Source 1: FMI normals 1991-2020
Source 2: Record highs and lows 1959- present

== Dialect ==
Ostrobothnian in red/orange, Savonian in green.

Vaala is located on the border between the Northern Ostrobothnian and Savonian (Kainuu) dialects.

== Notable people ==
- Anne Huotari (born 1959)
- Maustetytöt, band
- Tytti Seppänen (born 1980)

== See also ==
- Vaala Airfield
- Finnish national road 22
