= Vaala Airfield =

Vaala Airfield Vaalan lentokenttä
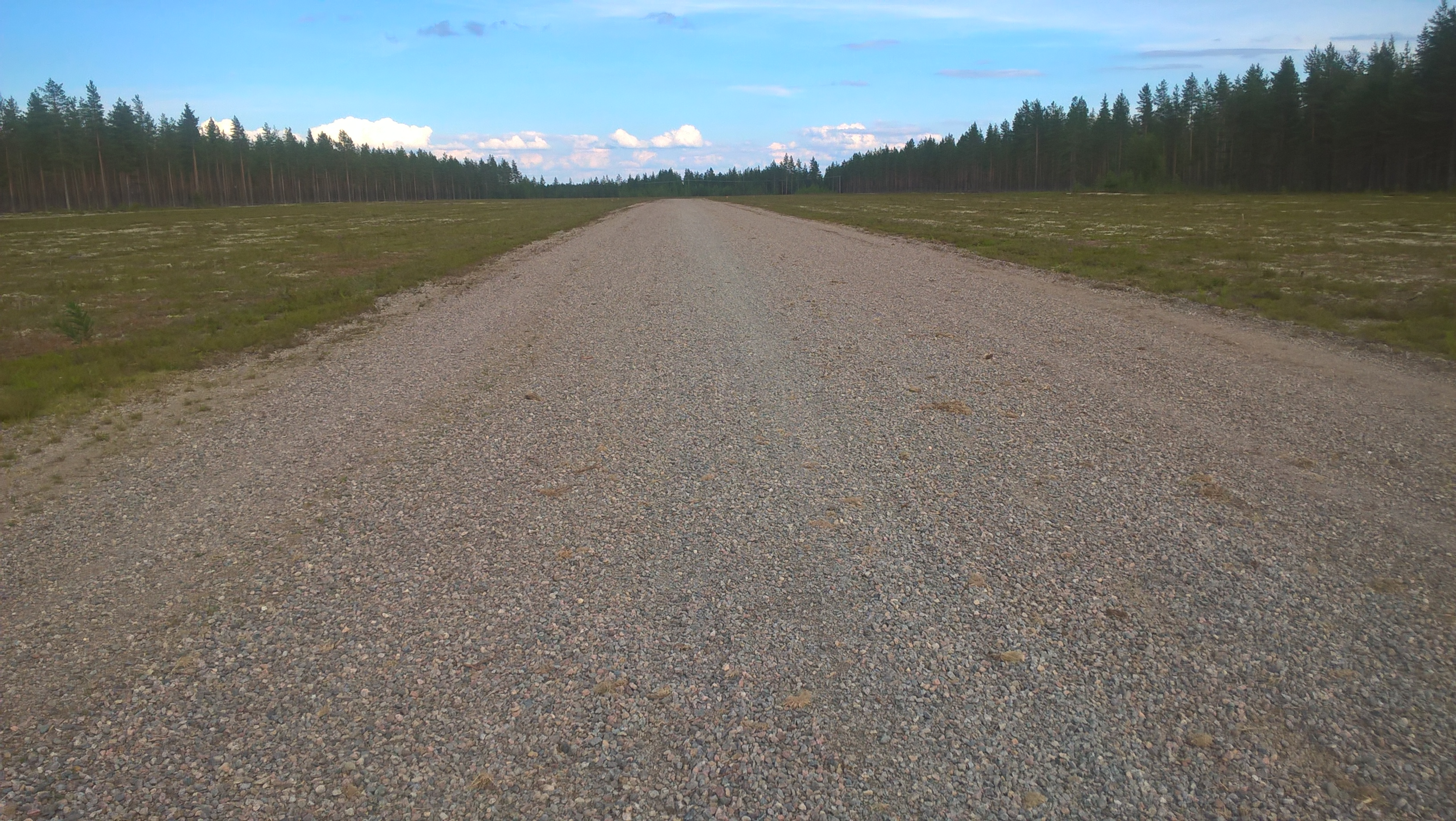
- Runway 09/27
- IATA: none; ICAO: EFVL

Summary
- Operator: Vaalan Ilmailukerho
- Location: Vaala, Finland
- Elevation AMSL: 443 ft / 135 m
- Coordinates: 64°30′07″N 026°45′36″E

Map
- Location within Finland

Runways
Direction	Length		Surface
Direction	m	ft	Surface
09/27	800	2,625	gravel
- Source: VFR Finland

Vaala Airfield is an airfield in Vaala, Finland, about 8 kilometres (5 mi) south-southwest of the Vaala municipal centre.

== See also ==
- List of airports in Finland
