= Helkavirsiä =

Poetry collection by Eino Leino

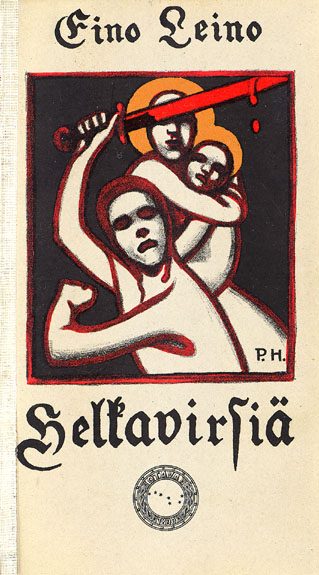
- Part I first edition cover, designed by painter Pekka Halonen
- Author: Eino Leino
- Language: Finnish
- Genre: Poetry
- Publisher: Otava, Helsinki
- Publication date: 1903 (part I), 1916 (part II)
- Publication place: Finland
- Pages: 160

Helkavirsiä (Swedish: Helkasånger; English: Whitsongs) is a two-part poetry collection by the Finnish poet Eino Leino, published in 1903 and 1916 respectively. Leino wrote the first part in Kangasniemi, in Central Finland, in the summer of 1903, while staying at the summer house of his friend and fellow writer, Otto Manninen.

The collection draws inspiration from the country's national epic Kalevala and other Finnish mythology, merging legends and ballads with modern themes and structures.

Helkavirsiä is considered not only Leino's breakthrough and one of his most notable works, but also seminal in the development of modern Finnish poetry and wider cultural identity.
