= Hämeen Sanomat =

Newspaper published in Hämeenlinna, Finland

- Type: Daily newspaper
- Format: Broadsheet
- Publisher: Keskisuomalainen; Hämeen Media
- Editor-in-chief: Tuulia Viitanen
- Founded: 1878; 148 years ago
- Political alignment: Independent; IKL/Kok (before 1941)
- Language: Finnish
- City: Hämeenlinna
- Country: Finland
- ISSN: 0356-2751

Hämeen Sanomat is a morning broadsheet newspaper published in Hämeenlinna, Finland.

== History and profile ==
Hämeen Sanomat was established in 1879. The headquarters of the paper is in Hämeenlinna. The owner of the paper which is published in broadsheet format seven days per week is Hämeen Sanomat Oy. Its publisher is Hämeen Lehtipaino Oy.

In 2002 Hämeen Sanomat had a circulation of 30,076 copies. It was over 27,000 copies in 2011. The circulation of the paper was 26,131 copies in 2013.

== See also ==
- Berliner (format)
