= Tytti Seppänen =

Finnish politician

Tytti Määttä

Regional Mayor of North Savo
- Incumbent
- Assumed office 1 January 2023
- Preceded by: Marko Korhonen

Personal details
- Born: Tytti Seppänen; January 1, 1980 (age 45) Vaala, Finland
- Political party: Centre Party
- Education: Master of Social Sciences, University of Turku

Tytti Määttä (née Seppänen; born 1 January 1980) is a Finnish civil servant and politician who has served as the regional mayor (maakuntajohtaja) of the Council of North Savo since 1 January 2023.

She previously headed two municipalities, serving as city manager of Kuhmo from 2018 to 2022 and as municipal manager of her home municipality, Vaala (2009–2017). Määttä holds a Master of Social Sciences degree from the University of Turku.

== Career ==
In October 2009 Määttä moved from her position as a senior specialist at the Association of Finnish Local and Regional Authorities to become municipal manager of Vaala, where she served for eight years. She was appointed city manager of Kuhmo in December 2017 and took office in 2018, remaining until her election as regional mayor of North Savo in late 2022.

In August 2019 the Ministry of Economic Affairs and Employment commissioned Määttä to examine ways of increasing location-independent and multi-local work within organisations under the ministry’s purview.

== Political activity ==
Määttä was a member of the Turku City Council from 2004 to 2008. She has served as vice-chair of the Finnish Centre Youth and chair of the Nordic Centre Youth, and in 2006 was elected president of the Nordic Youth Council.

== Awards and recognition ==
- Rural Personality of the Year 2019 (Vuoden maaseutukasvo), Finnish Village Association.
- Energetic Civil Servant of Kainuu 2019 (Kainuun Vireä Virkamies), Kajaani Junior Chamber International.
- Honourable mention as “Municipal Manager of the Decade” 2021, Foundation for Municipal Development (Kunnallisalan kehittämissäätiö).
