= Oulujoki =

River of Finland

Oulujoki Ule älv
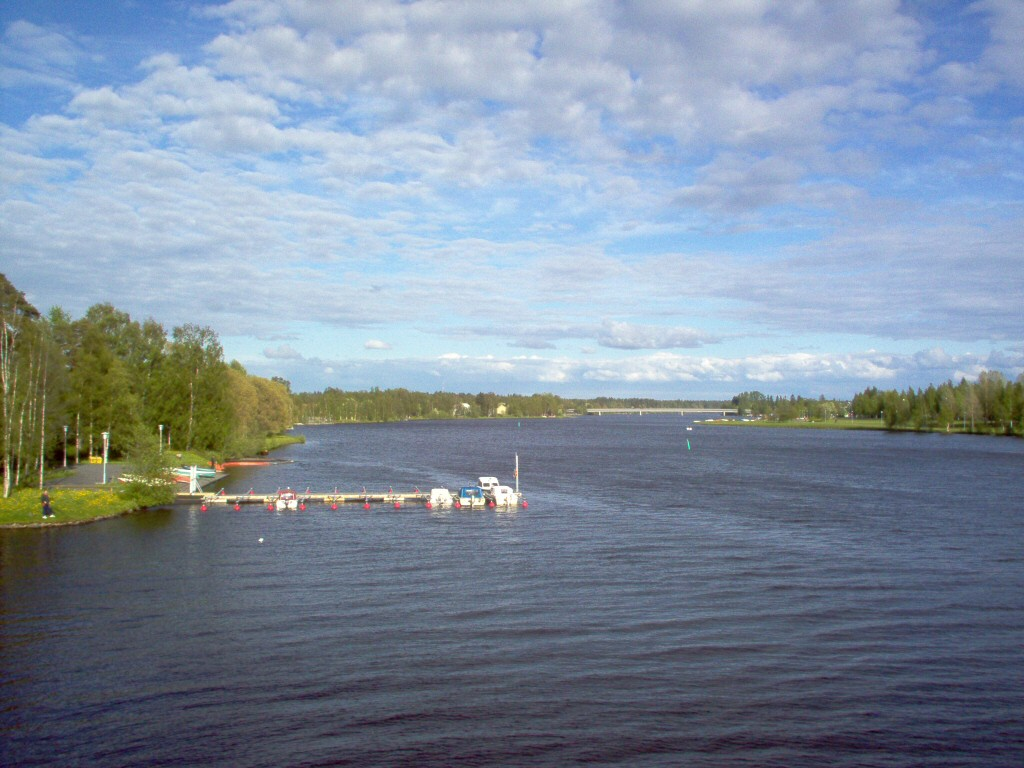
- Oulujoki river in Laanila, Oulu

Location
- Country: Finland

Physical characteristics
- Source: Oulujärvi
  - location: Vaala, Finland
  - coordinates: 64°33′N 026°50′E
  - elevation: 122 m (400 ft)
- Mouth: Bothnian Bay
  - location: Oulu, Finland
  - coordinates: 65°01′N 025°27′E
  - elevation: 0 m (0 ft)
- Length: 107 km (66 mi)
- Basin size: 22,900 km^{2} (8,800 sq mi)
- Discharge
  - average: 250 m^{3}/s (8,800 cu ft/s)

Basin features
- Tributaries
  - left: Muhosjoki
  - right: Sanginjoki, Utosjoki, Kutujoki

Oulujoki (Swedish: Ule älv) is a river in North Ostrobothnia, Finland. Its name in Finnish literally means "Oulu River", originally in old Northern Ostrobothnian dialect literally "Flood River". Its origin is Oulujärvi, and its watershed area covers a significant part of Kainuu region. It flows into the Bothnian Bay at Oulu. Port of Oulu is located at the mouth of the river.

== History ==
In 2026, sediment flowed into the river after Google cleared 330 hectares (820 acres) of forest to construct a data center.
