= Eino Leino =

Finnish poet and journalist (1878–1926)

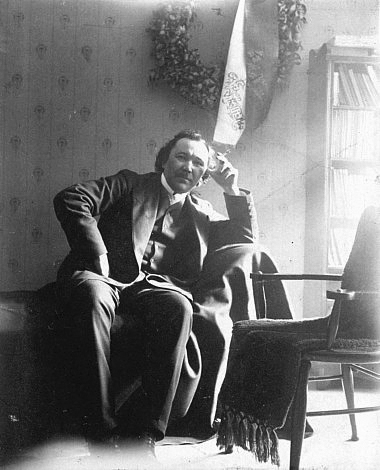
- Eino Leino in 1912
- Born: Armas Einar Leopold Lönnbohm; 6 July 1878; Paltaniemi, Paltamo, Finland
- Died: 10 January 1926 (aged 47); Tuusula, Finland

Eino Leino (born Armas Einar Leopold Lönnbohm; 6 July 1878 – 10 January 1926) was a Finnish poet and journalist who is considered one of the pioneers of Finnish poetry and a national poet of Finland. His poems combine modern and Finnish folk elements. Much of his work is in the style of the Kalevala and folk songs in general. Nature, love, and despair are frequent themes in Leino's work. He is beloved and widely read in Finland today.

Leino's birthday on 6 July was named Eino Leino Day (Eino Leinon päivä) as well as day of Finnish poetry and summer in 1992, and it is an established Finnish flag day.

== Early life ==
Eino Leino was baptized as Armas Einar Leopold Lönnbohm in Paltamo as the seventh and youngest son in a family of ten children. Leino's family lived in the Hövelö house in Paltaniemi village. Leino's father had changed his name from Antti Mustonen to Anders Lönnbohm to improve his chances of marrying his future upper-class wife, Anna Emilia Kyrenius. Eino's older brother Kasimir Leino was an important cultural figure in Finland. He was a poet, critic, and theatre director. Eino and Kasimir Leino founded a literature journal together in 1898.

Leino published his first poem at the age of 12 and a collection of poems, Maaliskuun lauluja, at 18.

Leino's parents died while he was still in school. He started school in Kajaani and continued in Oulu and Hämeenlinna, where he boarded with relatives. After graduating from the Hämeenlinna secondary school, Leino started studying at the University of Helsinki.

== Writing career ==
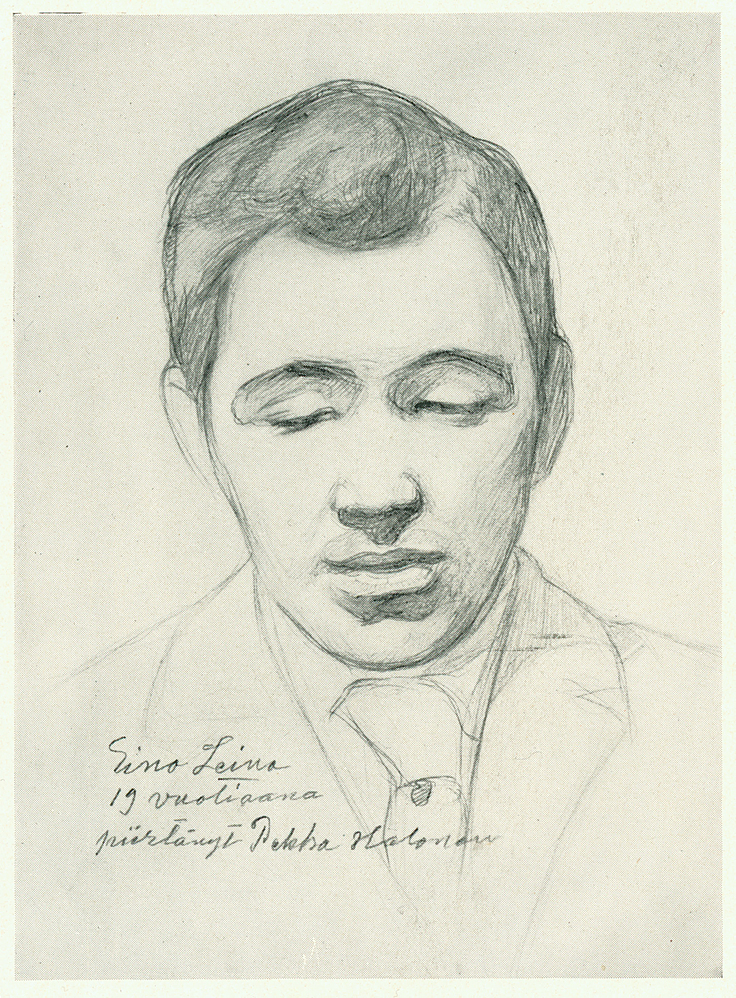
Young Leino by Pekka Halonen in 1897

Early in his career Eino Leino was much loved and praised by the critics. He joined literary and newspaper circles and became a member of the Young Finnish circle. Among Leino's friends were the artist Pekka Halonen and Otto Manninen, who gained fame as a poet and translator.

As early as November 1917, Eino Leino had annoyedly warned in the Sunnuntai magazine that the country was "on the brink of civil war," and fiercely criticized the Socialists as they set out to "pursue their cause with civil blood and the stings of a foreign conqueror" (No. 40-41 / 1917). The political situation, which escalated into the Finnish Civil War, was a bitter experience for Leino, who had always written for tolerance and also appreciated the labor movement from which he had good friends. Leino experienced the events of the spring of 1918 in the Red-conquered Helsinki, and he described his experiences in the report novel The Conquest of Helsinki (1918). He greeted the German Baltic Sea Division, which had invaded southern Finland and conquered Helsinki, as a liberator. But on the other hand, Leino later drove a general amnesty for Red Side line men and women in prisons and demanded the abolition of the death penalty. In April 1918, Leino's six-part series of articles called "For the Finnish Workers" was published in the Social Democratic magazine Työn valta ("Power of Labor"), in which he, as an impartial writer belonging to the "civilized poverty", strongly appealed for peace and mutual understanding. “Social democracy would no longer have a future in Finland unless it was able to internalize the "eternal ideals" of legitimacy, democracy and civil liberty,” he wrote.

After the Finnish Civil War, Leino's idealistic faith for national unity collapsed, and his influence as a journalist and polemicist weakened. He was granted a State writer's pension in 1918 at the age of forty. Although publishing prolifically, he had financial problems and his health deteriorated. "Life is always a struggle with eternal forces," Leino said in a letter in 1925 to his friend Bertel Gripenberg.

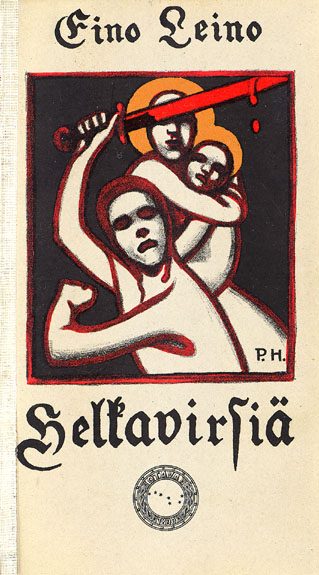
Cover of Helkavirsiä by Pekka Halonen, 1903

Leino published over 70 books of poems and stories. The most famous of these are the two poem collections Helkavirsiä (1903 and 1916), in which he extensively uses Finnish mythology and folklore.

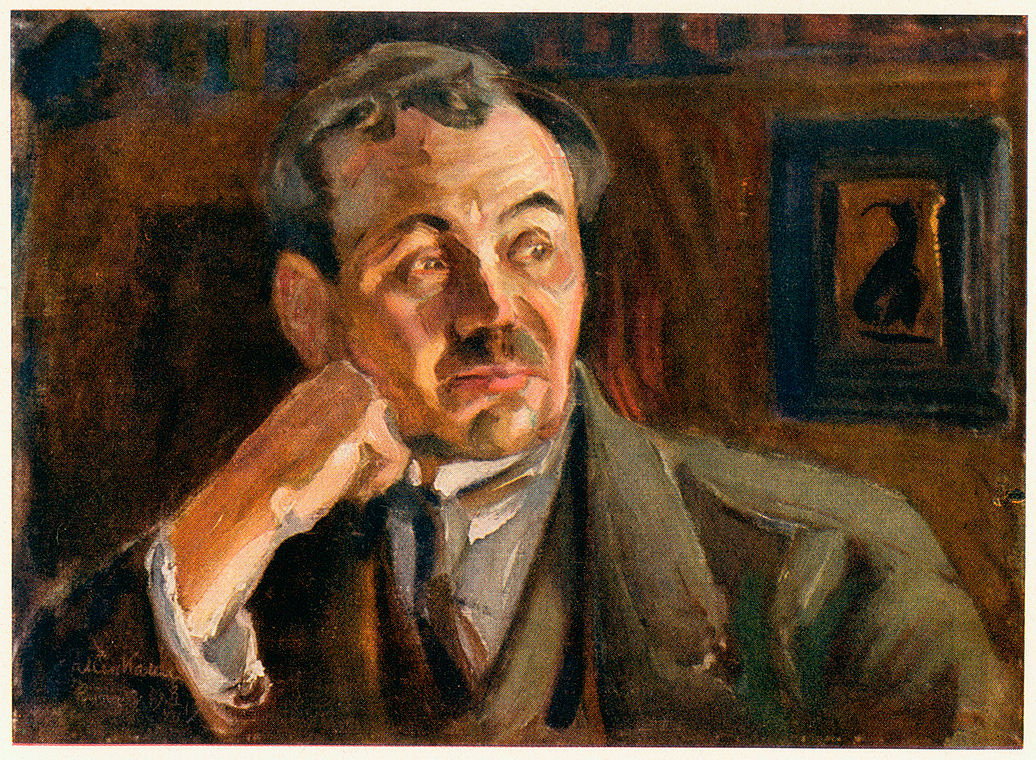
Portrait by Akseli Gallen-Kallela in 1917

In addition to writing poetry, Eino Leino wrote in newspapers about theatre and culture in general, and translated works of important writers such as Runeberg and Goethe. He was the first person in Finland to translate Dante's Divine Comedy into Finnish.

In the summer of 1921, Leino traveled to Estonia for a written tour organized by the Finnish-Estonian friends Aino and Gustav Suits. With his poetry evenings, presentations and celebrations in Tartu and Tallinn, the trip became a success, and Eino Leino was received everywhere as a significant poet. After his trip to Estonia, he signed his third marriage to bank clerk Hanna Laitinen. The desperate attempt to gain support and security ended almost immediately in the separation of the spouses. In 1921, Leino applied for exemption from Finnish citizenship. He wrote letters to President K. J. Ståhlberg and Estonian Head of State Konstantin Päts asking to become an Estonian citizen. Leino was tired of the lack of scholarships and the criticism he received.

Leino was married three times and had one daughter, Helka. He died in 1926 at the age of 47 and later he was buried at the Hietaniemi Cemetery in Helsinki. Already at that time as a famous man, he was buried at the expense of the state, and the funeral was attended by President L. K. Relander and other statesmen of the country.

The most detailed biography of Leino was written in 1930s by his lover and colleague L. Onerva. In the dramatic story Onerva is also writing about her own life.

There is no absolute certainty about the cause of Eino Leino's death. In the work of the writer Hannu Mäkelä, Mestari, the cause of Leino's death is described as advanced spinal cord disease and calcification of blood vessels, which is why blood had leaked into the brain. It is said that it had previously confused Leino's abdominal functions. According to Mäkelä, the cause of death was determined by both Dr. Wasastjerna and Dr. Lindén. On the other hand, the cause of Leino's death has also been suggested to be syphilis by Leino's personal doctor Väinö Lindén on the basis of L. Onerva's biographical margin.

== Literary style and importance ==
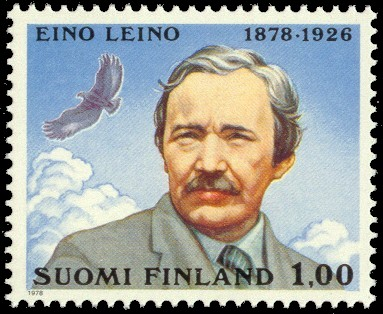
The 1978 postage stamp depicting Eino Leino

Leino is held to be the first and most important shaper of national romanticism in Finnish literature. Actually, Leino coined the term national neoromantism by himself to characterize the works by talents of young Finland such as composer Jean Sibelius, painter Akseli Gallen-Kallela and architect Eliel Saarinen.

Leino's style developed during his 35 year career. In his early works, including his most famous collection Helkavirsiä (1903) influence of the national epic Kalevala is visible.

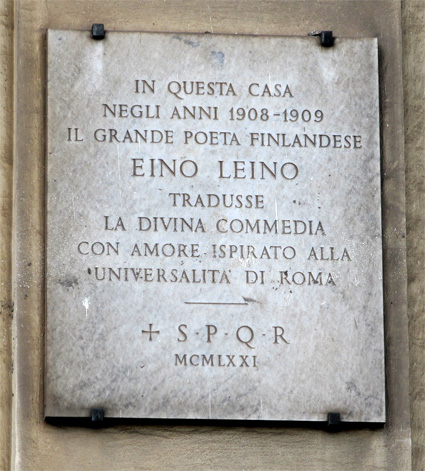
A memorial plaque in Rome on the banks of the Tiber on the wall of the building where Leino lived when he translated Dante's Divina Commedia.

In the middle of his career Leino translated classics of world literature to Finnish. At the same time he wrote his own works in several genres: poetry, plays, essays, reviews and other pieces of journalism. His work encompasses a wide emotional range, anything from profound love to misanthropy and biting criticism.

In his last years, after struggles in his personal life, Leino returned to the national romantic themes of his youth.

== Musical settings ==
As a major Finnish poet, Eino Leino's work has been extensively set to music by composers from his country, up to the present day.

- Toivo Kuula has set a total of 22 Leino poems, including the second of his Three Songs op. 2 ("Tuijotin tulehen kauan", Long have I stared into the fire, 1907) and his cantata for baritone, chorus and orchestra Kuolemattomuuden toivo op. 15 (Hope for Immortality, 1910).
- Leevi Madetoja's output contains multiple Leino settings, from the incidental music for Leino's play Chess in 1910 to the use of his poetry in one of his last works, the Choir Songs for male choir op. 81 (1945–46).
- Oskar Merikanto has also used Leino's poetry as material for over twenty of his art songs. (See his work catalogue.)
- Jean Sibelius has, relatively to the composers above, set few of Leino's texts, but one such is the major cantata for mixed choir Maan virsi op. 95 (Hymn of the Earth).
- Aarre Merikanto's Leino settings include the choir works Juhannus (Midsummer, 1946) and Ukri (1938/43).
- Jorma Panula's Juhana Herttuan ja Catharina Jagellonican lauluja (Songs of Duke John and Catherine Jagiellon, 1977) is an extensive setting of Leino's collection of the same name.
- Olli Mustonen's Sinfonia No. 1 for baritone and orchestra (2011) draws on Leino's collection Helkavirsiä.
- Kaija Saariaho's song cycle Leino Songs (2000-2007) is a setting a four poems by Leino handpicked from different collections. The cycle's original version for soprano and piano was premiered in 2007, followed by an orchestrated version the next year.

== See also ==
- The Eino Leino Prize
- The Eino Leino Statue
- Johan Ludvig Runeberg
- Poet and Muse
