= Paltaniemi =

- Village
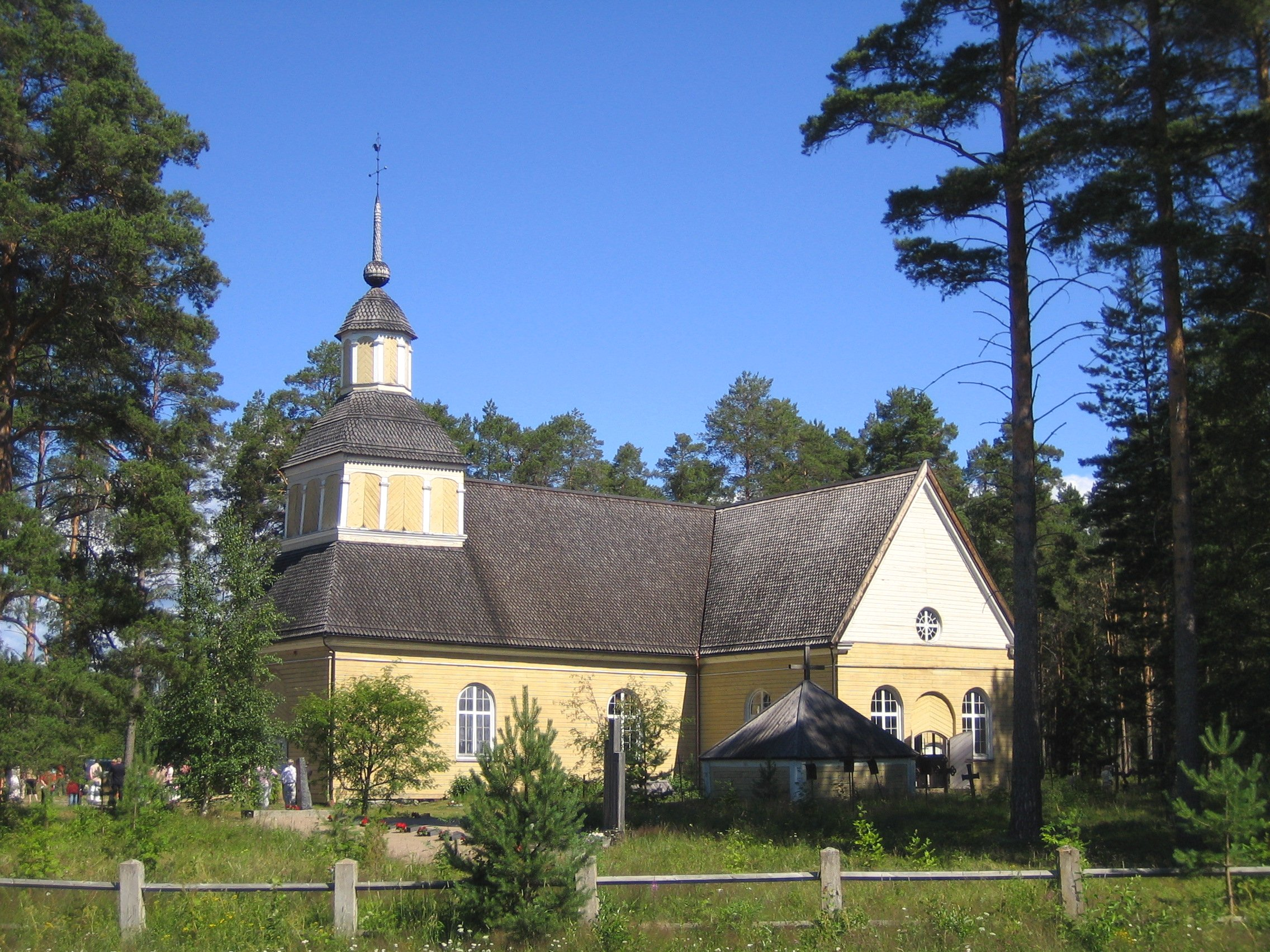
- Paltaniemi Church from 1726.

- Location in Finland
- Coordinates: 64°16′51″N 27°39′06″E
- Country: Finland
- Region: Kainuu
- Municipality: Kajaani

Area
  - Total: 2.55 km^{2} (0.98 sq mi)

Population (31 December 2020)
  - Total: 291
  - Density: 1,141/km^{2} (2,960/sq mi)
- Time zone: UTC+2 (EET)
  - Summer (DST): UTC+3 (EEST)

Paltaniemi is a village on the shores of Lake Oulujärvi, about 10 kilometres (6.2 mi) north of the Kajaani's town center in Kainuu, Finland. It has a population of 291 inhabitants (in December 2020). The Kajaani Airport is located in the eastern side of the village.

From the 17th century until the end of the 19th century, Paltaniemi was the spiritual center of Kainuu, where the most important priests and officials of the parish lived. Paltaniemi's current wooden church, completed in 1726, is the village's third; the first church was destroyed in an earthquake in 1626 and the second church was burned by the Russians during the Great Wrath in 1716. Paltaniemi belonged to Paltamo municipality until 1954, before the village was incorporated into Kajaanin maalaiskunta.

Paltaniemi is especially known as the birthplace of the Finnish poet Eino Leino, and the Eino Leino House museum is located on the site of his former birthplace. Elias Lönnrot, known as the compiler of the Finnish national epic Kalevala, also lived in the village while working as a doctor in Kajaani. The German zoologist Fritz Remmler, who also worked as a Gestapo spy, maintained a zoological station in Paltaniemi between 1928 and 1939.
