= Oulujärvi =

Lake of Northern Ostrobothnia and Kainuu, Finland

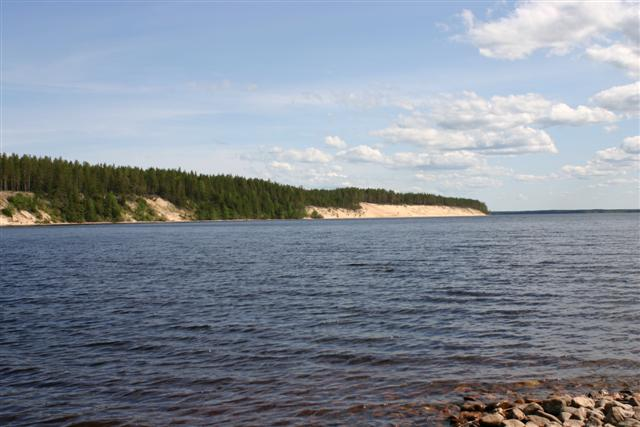
- Ärjänsaari

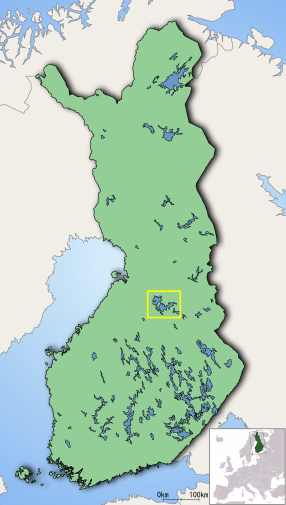
- Location of Oulujärvi in Finland

- Location within Finland

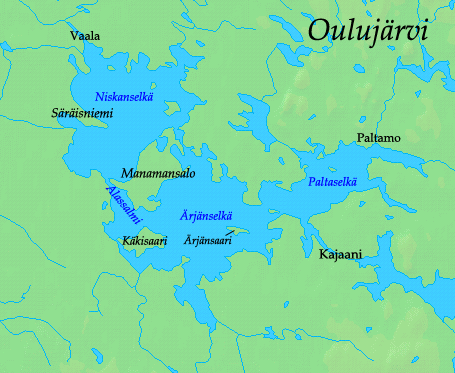
- Location: Kainuu, Finland
- Coordinates: 64°20′N 027°15′E
- Primary outflows: Oulu River
- Basin countries: Finland
- Surface area: 928.09 km^{2} (358.34 sq mi)
- Average depth: ca. 7 m (23 ft)
- Max. depth: 38 m (125 ft)
- Shore length^{1}: 1,201.17 km (746.37 mi)
- Surface elevation: 120.9–123.6 m (397–406 ft)
- Islands: Manamansalo, Ärjänsaari, Toukka, Kaarresalo, Hautakaarre
- Settlements: Kajaani, Paltamo, Vaala
- ^{1} Shore length is not a well-defined measure.

Oulujärvi (Finnish: [ˈou̯luˌjærʋi]) or Lake Oulu or Ule (Swedish: Ule träsk), is a large lake in the Kainuu region of Finland. It is also historically known as Lake Cajania from a former name of Kainuu. With an area of 928 square kilometres (358 sq mi) it is the fifth largest lake in the country. The lake is drained by the Oulu River, which flows northwestward from the lake into the Gulf of Bothnia. Its nickname is the "Kainuu Sea", and it is bordered by the three municipalities of Vaala, Paltamo, and Kajaani. About 40 percent of the lake is in Vaala.

== See also ==
- Mulkkusaaret
