= Paltamo =

- Municipality
- Paltamon kunta Paltamo kommun
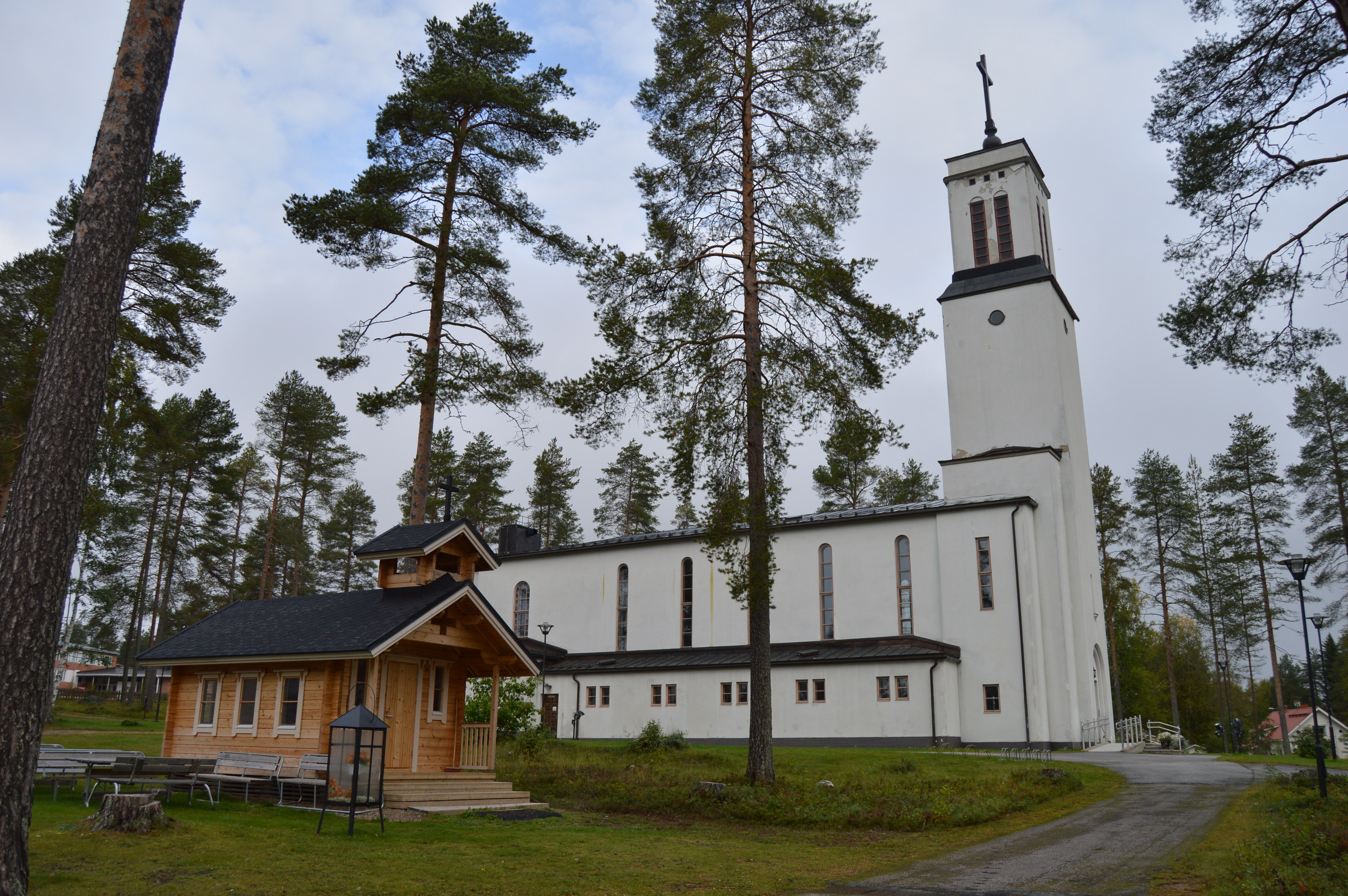
- Paltamo Church

- Coat of arms

- Location of Paltamo in Finland
- Interactive map of Paltamo
- Coordinates: 64°24.5′N 027°50.5′E
- Country: Finland
- Region: Kainuu
- Sub-region: Kajaani

Government
  - Municipal manager: Pasi Ahoniemi

Area (2018-01-01)
  - Total: 1,139.12 km^{2} (439.82 sq mi)
  - Land: 918.79 km^{2} (354.75 sq mi)
  - Water: 220.23 km^{2} (85.03 sq mi)
  - Rank: 85th largest in Finland

Population (2025-12-31)
  - Total: 2,941
  - Rank: 211th largest in Finland
  - Density: 3.2/km^{2} (8.3/sq mi)

Population by native language
  - Finnish: 98% (official)
  - Others: 2%

Population by age
  - 0 to 14: 12.3%
  - 15 to 64: 53.7%
  - 65 or older: 34%
- Time zone: UTC+02:00 (EET)
  - Summer (DST): UTC+03:00 (EEST)
- Website: www.paltamo.fi/en/

Paltamo (Swedish: Paltamo, also Paldamo) is a municipality of Finland. It is part of the Kainuu region. The municipality has a population of 2,941 (31 December 2025) and covers an area of 1,139.12 square kilometres (439.82 sq mi) of which 220.23 km^{2} (85.03 sq mi) is water. The population density is 3.2 inhabitants per square kilometre (8.3/sq mi). There are two built-up areas in the municipality: Kontiomäki and Paltamo. Kontiomäki has about 600 inhabitants.

It is 37 kilometres (23 mi) from Paltamo to Kajaani and 145 kilometres (90 mi) to Oulu.

The municipality is unilingually Finnish.

== History ==
Paltamo was first inhabited 8,500 years ago. The most sophisticated finding yet has been a weapon shaped like a bear's head. In 1552 king Gustav Vasa gave an order in which the areas of the Lake Oulu were to be inhabited. 140 families left there. In 1555 it was counted that there were 133 families living in Paltamo. The picture church of Paltamo was built in 1726 by Johan Simonpoika Knubb. It was the fourth church on the site. One of the most important persons in the Finnish history of literature – Eino Leino – was born in Hövelö in 1878. Today Paltamo is one of the slowly declining municipalities of Finland.

The name Paltamo comes from the Finnish word palta "coastal slope".

== Heraldry ==
The word paltamo means a tar boat in the Kainuu dialect, which is the reason the coat of arms of Paltamo has three black tar boats on a golden background.

== Politics ==
Results of the 2023 Finnish parliamentary election in Paltamo:

- Centre Party 30.3%
- Finns Party 25.8%
- National Coalition Party 12.1%
- Left Alliance 11.8%
- Social Democratic Party 9.8%
- Christian Democrats 5.4%
- Green League 2.7%

As of 2021 Finnish municipal elections, Paltamo municipal council is made up of: Centre Party (11 seats), Left Alliance (3), Finns Party (3), National Coalition Party (2), Social Democratic Party (1), and Christian Democrats (1).

== See also ==
- Finnish national road 22
- Paltaniemi
