= Regional anthems of Finland =

Regional anthems of Finland (Finnish: Suomen maakuntalaulut, Swedish: Finländska landskapssånger) are songs which were composed or later selected to be anthems of Finland's historical provinces and current regions. The best known regional anthems in Finland are Karjalaisten laulu (anthem of North Karelia and South Karelia) and Nälkämaan laulu (anthem of Kainuu).

The oldest regional anthem in Finland, Savolaisen laulu, was born out of patriotism when laws limiting publishing and Finnish student nations were passed in the Grand Duchy of Finland in the 1850s. This first regional anthem also worked as a model for the others with its structure, with depictions of the region's history, nature and people. Just like Savolaisen laulu, many other regional anthems were later created for student nations around the country, as well as other societies.

== List of Regional anthems ==
Regional	Song	Composer(s)	Lyricist(s)	Year of composition / first performance
Central Finland	"Keski-Suomen kotiseutulaulu" ("Domicile Song of Central Finland")	Ivar Widéen	Martti Korpilahti	1920
Central Ostrobothnia	"Keski-Pohjanmaan laulu" ("Song of Central Ostrobothnia")	Oskari Metsola	Oskari Metsola	1929
Kainuu	"Nälkämaan laulu" ("Song of the Hunger Land")	Oskar Merikanto	Ilmari Kianto	1911
Kanta-Häme	"Hämäläisten laulu" ("Song of the Tavastians")	German melody	J. H. Erkko	1871
Kymenlaakso	"Kymenlaakson laulu" ("Song of Kymenlaakso")	Uuno Klami	Aukusti Simojoki	1934
Lapland*; North Ostrobothnia	"Kymmenen virran maa" ("Land of Ten Streams")	Oskar Merikanto	A. V. Koskimies	1906
North Karelia; South Karelia	"Karjalaisten laulu" ("Song of the Karelians")	P. J. Hannikainen	P. J. Hannikainen	1899
North Savo; South Savo	"Savolaisen laulu" ("Song of a Savonian")	Karl Collan	A. Oksanen	1852
Ostrobothnia; South Ostrobothnia	"Vaasan marssi" ("March of Vaasa")	Karl Collan	Zacharias Topelius	1864
Pirkanmaa	"Kesäpäivä Kangasalla" ("Summer Day at Kangasala")	Gabriel Linsén	Zacharias Topelius	1864
Päijät-Häme	"Vihreiden harjujen maa" ("Land of Green Ridges")	Matti Porola	Matti Porola and Terho Laitinen	1999
Satakunta	"Satakunnan laulu" ("Song of Satakunta")	Aksel Törnudd	Aino Voipio	1912
Southwest Finland	"Varsinaissuomalaisten laulu" ("Song of the Finns proper")	Toivo Louko	Väinö Kulo	1915
Uusimaa	"Uusmaalaisten laulu" ("Song of the Uusimaa people")	Jean Sibelius	Kaarlo Terhi	1912
Åland	"Ålänningens sång" ("Song of the Ålander")	Johan Fridolf Hagfors	John Grandell	1922

*While Kymmenen virran maa is considered to be Lapland's regional anthem in the official sense due to Southern Lapland's close historical ties to North Ostrbothnia, sometimes the song Lapinmaa ("Lapland") is treated as Lapland's anthem. Lapinmaa was written by Maija Konttinen and composed by Armas Maasalo sometime between 1914–1917.

== See also ==
- List of regional anthems
