= Kainuu people =

Finnish ethnic group

- Flag of the Kainuu region

Total population
- 70,000–80,000

Regions with significant populations
- Kainuu; North Ostrobothnia

Languages
- Kainuu dialect of Finnish

Religion
- Lutheranism

Related ethnic groups
- Savonians, other Finns

Kainuu people (Finnish: kainuulaiset) are Eastern Finnish inhabitants of the Kainuu region.

Kainuu was settled by Savonians in the 16th century but historically belonged to Ostrobothnia County and Oulu Province. This allowed for a separate Kainuu identity to emerge in the late 19th century.

Kainuu people speak the Kainuu dialect, which is a part of the Savonian dialects of Finnish. Kainuu people are sometimes considered to be Savonians. However, Kainuu people themselves do not think so but have a separate Kainuu identity.

Most Kainuu people are Lutherans.

== Name ==
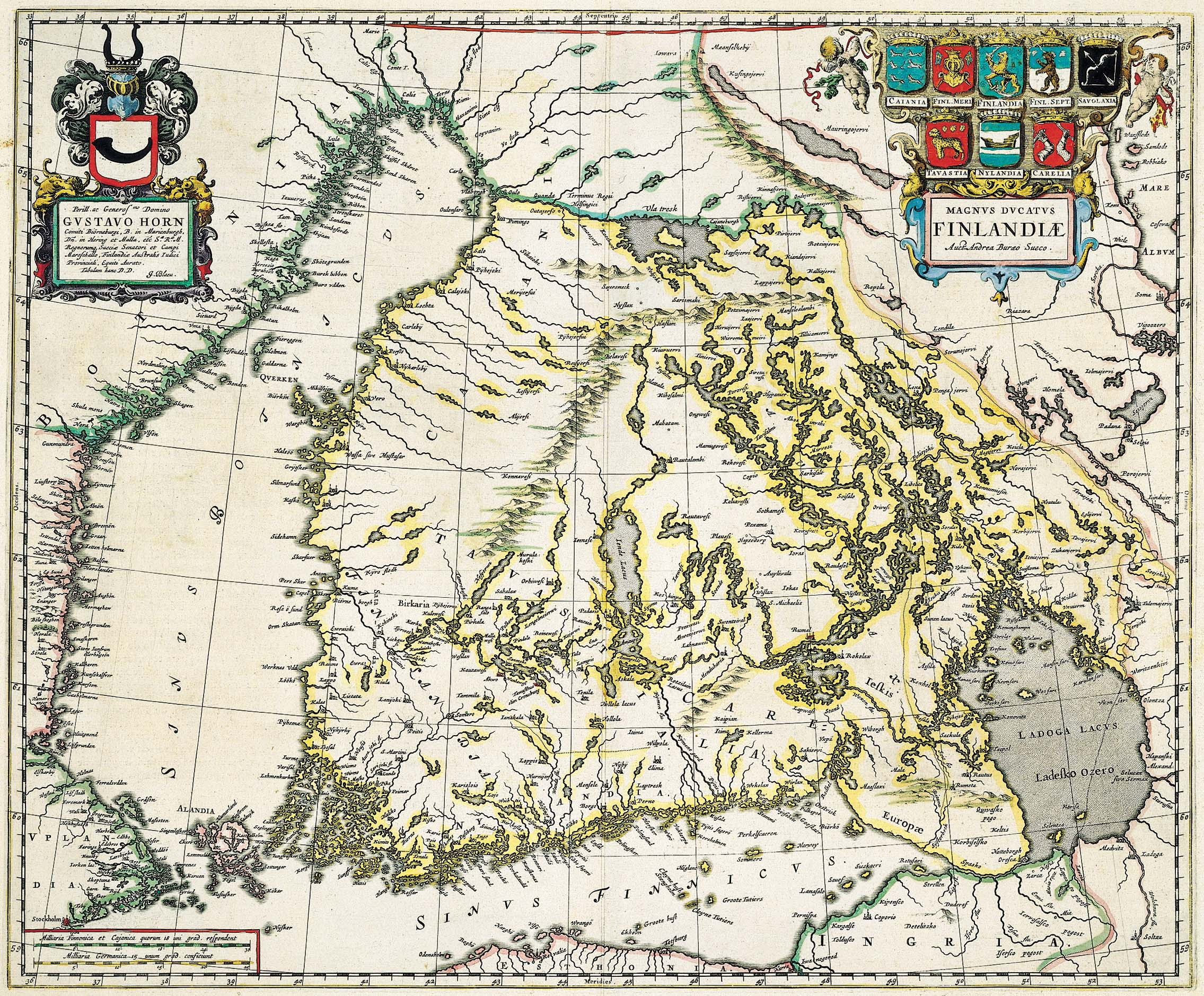
A 1662 map of Finland labels Ostrobothnia and Kainuu as "Caiania" (Kainuu's Latin name).

Originally, the area of Kainuu was known as the Oulujärvi Parish (Finnish: Oulujärven pitäjä), and later Kajaani Province (Kajaanin lääni). In 1604, construction began on Kajaani Castle (Swedish: Kajaneborg). The name Kajaani derives from the Russian form Kajánij, which Swedish authorities had encountered in Russian sources. The town of Kajaani (Kajana) was founded next to the castle in 1651. Today, Kajaani is the largest town in Kainuu, and the Swedish name for the region remains Kajanaland.

In the 17th century, the term Kainuu, which was previously used to refer to the coasts of Ostrobothnia, was first used to refer to the area of modern-day Kainuu. In 1663, the provost of Paltamo, Johannes Cajanus, referred to the inhabitants of Paltamo and Sotkamo ("Cainoa") as cainolaiset. However, this term didn't gain wider usage at the time. Karelians in the east called the area of modern-day Kainuu with the name before it became commonly used.

The Holbergordbogen Danish language dictionary for words used in 1700–1750 define Cajania as the "name of the Swedish province of Ostrobothnia" and Cajaner as its inhabitants. In 1608, Charles IX of Sweden declared himself the king of various regions and peoples, including the Cajaner.

The 18th century compiler of folk culture Christfried Ganander wrote about Cajana province, also known as Cajnun maa in his 1789 book Mythologia Fennica. He equated it to Kvenland and described it as an old seat of the brave Amazons and shield-maidens. He claimed its name to have come from a graven image named Janus near Ämmäkoski rapid which the locals supposedly called out to by crying: "Ca — Janus!". Kainulaiset he described as being a term used by Savonians to refer to the inhabitants of the parishes of Ostrobothnia, who live by the waterfront and speak a "finer or nobler Finnish" (murtaa kainuuxi).

In the early 20th century, when the Kainuu identity was forming, multiple names were used for the region, such as Kainuu, Kainuunmaa (land of Kainuu), Korpi-Kainuu (Wilderness Kainuu), Nälkämaa (Hunger land) and Ylimaa (Upper land). Eventually the name Kainuu, which was supported, for example, by the local newspaper Kainuun Sanomat, became the standard. In the newspaper, Kainuu people were usually called Kainuun kansa (the people/nation of Kainuu). Other terms used included kyntäjäväki (plowing people), talonpoikaiskansa (peasant people), korpiloukkojen kansa (people of wilderness hollows), and Kalevan heimo (tribe of Kaleva).

The etymological origin of the word Kainuu is unknown. Theories include kainu/kaino ’lowlands’ from Germanic (like Swedish dialectical hven ’wetland’), kainus ’knob-headed staff, wedge-shaped object’, a Sámi origin (South Sámi gaajnuo, gaajnuoladdje ’peasant (non-Sámi)’, Lule Sámi kai´nōlatj ’Swedish coastal peasant’, in a non-specified Swedish Sámi language kainolats, kainahaljo ’Swedish or Norwegian peasant’), or a connection to Old Icelandic kveinir, kvænir, kuen(n)er ’a North Scandinavian people, likely Finnish’ and Nynorsk kvæn ’Kven, Finnish’. A newer theory suggests it would originate from the Proto-Norse word *gainu-z ’gap, jaw’. If this is the case, the Kainua-related names in Kainuu could be over 1,000 years old, initially referring to the waterways ("gaps") around Lake Oulujärvi, such as the rivers of Kivesjärvi.

The way the name appears in the Kainuu dialect in old Kainuu placenames is Kaenuo (standard Finnish: Kainua).

== History ==
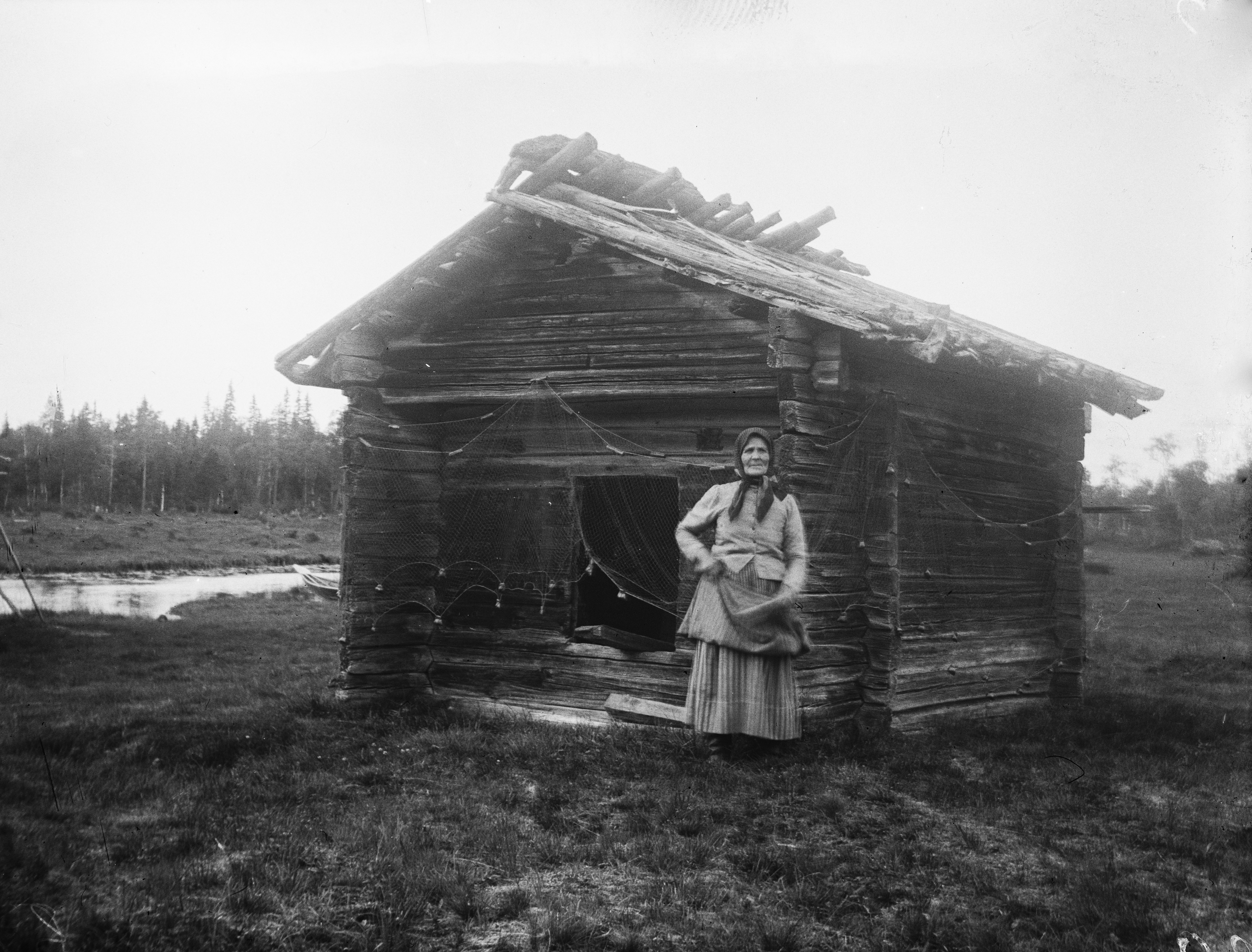
A 1915 photo of a woman in front of a granary built in 1690, Hyrynsalmi.

=== 16th century ===
In the turn of the 16th century, there were no permanent settlements or villages in Kainuu. However, the wilderness was used by a few nomadic Sámi, as well as Ostrobothnians and Karelians, for fishing and hunting. If the population density among these Sámi was similar to that of other Sámi further north in the 1600s, their number in Kainuu would have been approximately 350 individuals.

Savonian settlers began moving into Kainuu in the 1550s, encouraged by the King Gustav Vasa of Sweden. They practised slash-and-burn agriculture. Although the Treaty of Nöteborg in 1323 had assigned the area to Russia, Swedish rulers sought to establish a Savonian presence in the region for political reasons. In the following decades, Russians tried to eliminate the Savonian villages in the region through raids and by killing their inhabitants.

This period, which was a part of a larger border conflict between Sweden and Russia, is known to Kainuu people as rappasodat ("pillaging wars"). During these wars the Finns of north Ostrobothnia and Kainuu and the Karelians of White Karelia practised guerrilla warfare against each other. In the Treaty of Teusina that ended the Russo-Swedish War of 1590–1595, Kainuu was made a part of the Kingdom of Sweden, bringing an end to the border conflict. Many Savonian families were again encouraged or forced by the order of the king to move to Kainuu. By the end of the century, Paltaniemi had become the center of the rural municipality.

=== 17th–18th centuries ===
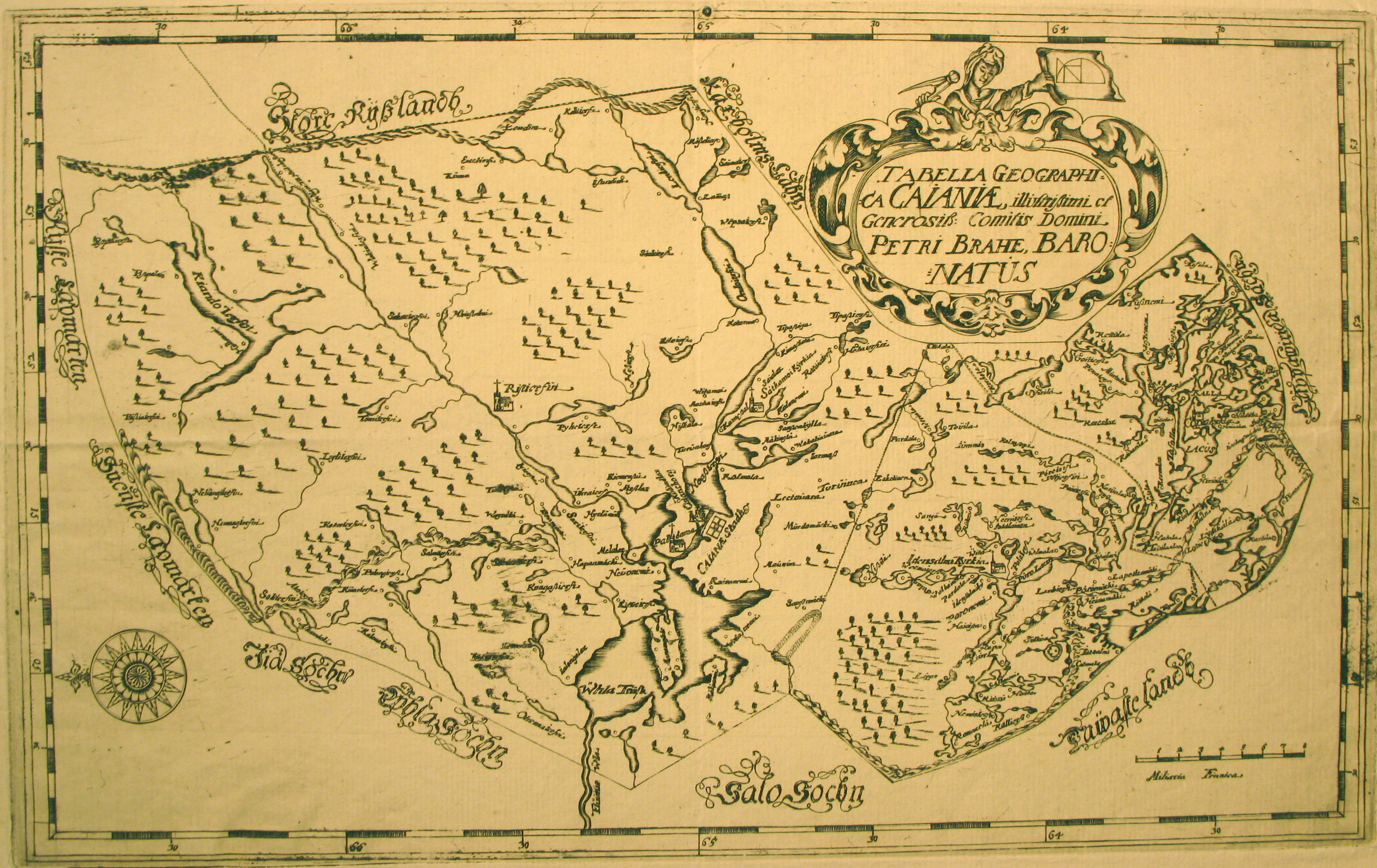
Map of the Barony of Kajaani from early 1650s (north is to the left)

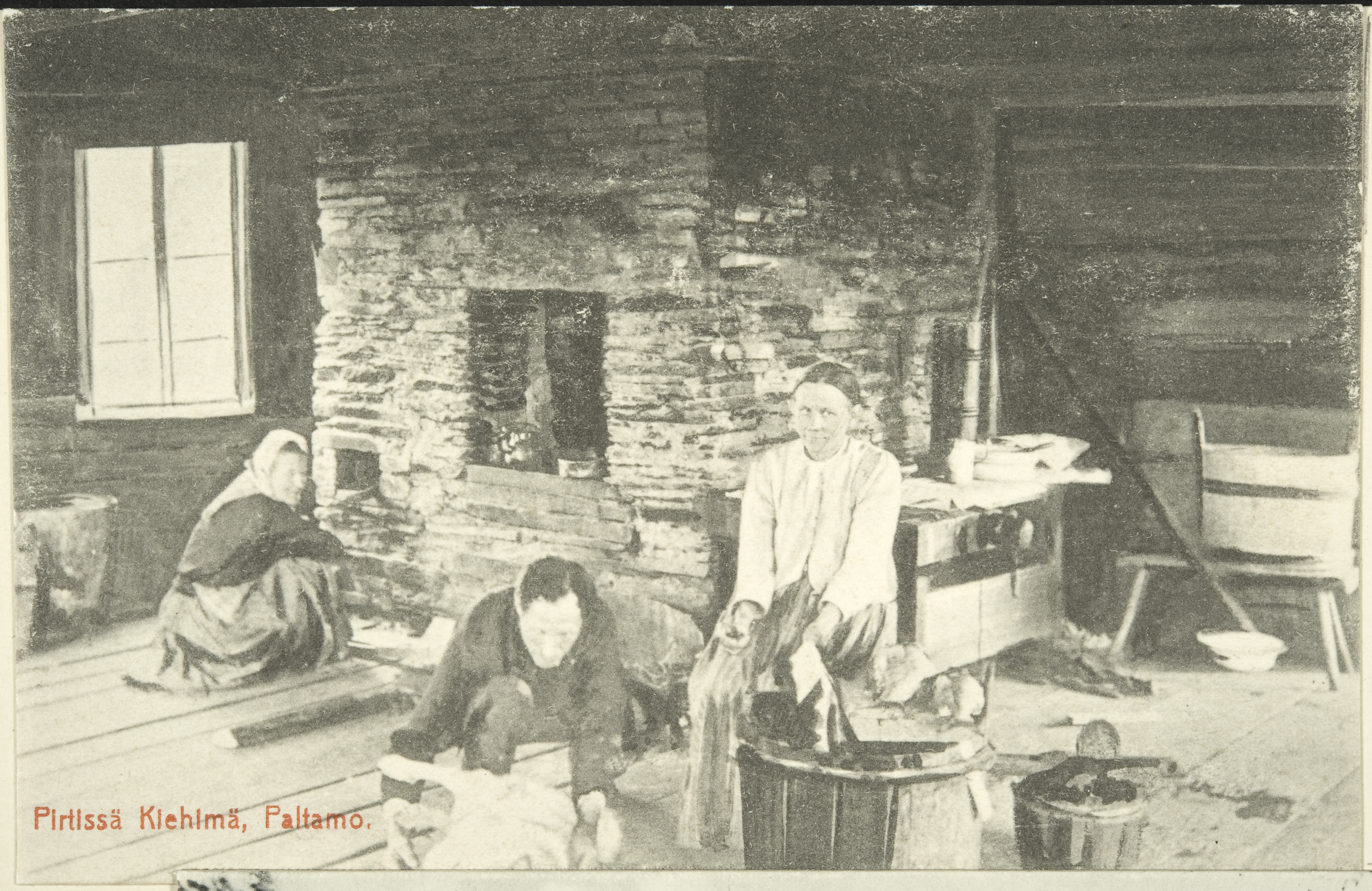
A peasant's house, Paltamo, 1906.

As a result of the war, Kainuu was incorporated into the province of Ostrobothnia. In 1604, King Charles IX ordered the construction Kajaani Castle (Cajanaborg) to protect the region and serve as its administrative center. The initiative for the building of the castle was put forward by Klemetti Eerikinpoika, a Kainuu war leader from the era of rappasodat.

In 1650, region was a made a barony under Per Brahe the Younger, which resulted in the region being led fairly independently. The town of Kajaani was founded in 1651 around the castle. During this period, the area came to be popularly referred to as "Kajaani Province," even though it was not officially a province, but a part of Ostrobothnia County. However, it got to keep its civil administrative system, remaining as its own hundred.

The barony was dissolved during the Great Reduction in 1681. At the end of the century, the population declined due to Great Famine. The people suffered again in the early 18th century during the Russian military occupation of Finland during the Great Northern War, during which Kajaani Castle was destroyed.

=== 19th–20th centuries ===
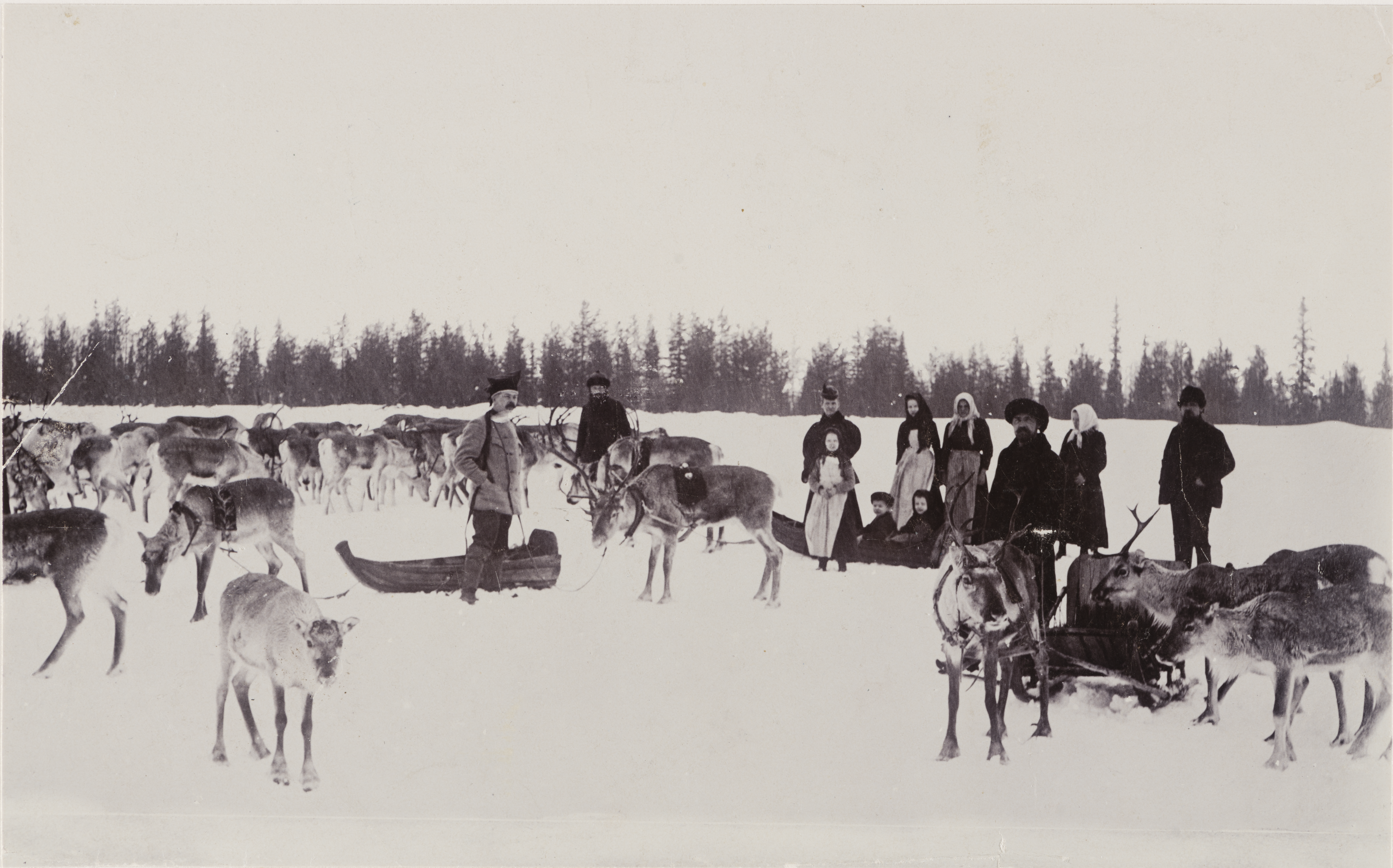
People and reindeer in Hyrynsalmi in 1912.

In the 19th century, the tar industry became incredibly important for the people of Kainuu, as Kainuu was the center of the industry in Finland. Although a bit of Kainuu folk poetry had already been collected in the 18th century, the popularity of national romanticism in the 19th century brought further attention to Kainuu. This included collecting folk poetry of pagan origin that had survived in oral tradition, such as spells and tales involving mythological figures like Väinämöinen and Lemminkäinen.

At the turn of the 20th century, the region was made known by Kainuu author Ilmari Kianto and poet Eino Leino, who is considered a national poet of Finland. Kainuu came to be known as the land of tar, bark bread and hunger. At the same time, the Kainuu identity was forming, and the word Kainuu became the primary word to refer to the region.

During the Winter War, the Soviet Union tried to split Finland in half by going through Kainuu to Oulu. This advance was stopped by Finns in the Battle of Suomussalmi.

== Dialect ==
Kainuu people speak the Kainuu dialect which is one of the Savonian dialects of Finnish. It differs from other Savonian dialects in its vocabulary which has been heavily influenced by Central and Northern Ostrobothnian dialects.

One common feature in the dialect is diphthong reduction: Kaenuu ("Kainuu").

Example from Puolanka:

Jaakko Heikkinen on July 12, 1960, in his home at Nurmi, Kivarijärvi, Puolanka
Kainuu dialect	Standard Finnish	English translation
Siihen se jäe meillä sittä ja tultiim maantiellej ja vielä sano että meillä pitää uusi kerta käyvvän ni... Kyllähäm minä sen tiesin, että, se eij_oo' 'oekkeem mieliksi se minun sanonta va' 'em malttanu' 'ollam minä sano_tta no "käyvvääj jonnaep pyhänä uusi kerta". Van se kieltäösi ettei häm pyhämettyystä tykkeä' 'oekeen. Ja se oli, lähtenys sittä kahem muum miehen kansa, seoraavan kerran sinnek kahtelemaan sitä ketun peseä. Ne oli eksyneet ja päevän kävelleet ja, ei ne ollus sitä löytäneet sen kovemmin.	Siihen se sitten jäi meillä ja tulimme maantielle, ja sanoin vielä, että meillä pitää uuden kerran käydä, niin... Kyllähän minä sen tiesin, ettei se minun sanoma oikein mieliksi ollut, vaan en malttanut olla sanomatta, että: "Käydään jonakin pyhänä uudemman kerran". Vaan hän kieltäytyi, ettei hän oikein pyhämetsästyksestä tykkää. Ja hän oli sitten lähtenyt sinne seuraavan kerran kahden muun miehen kanssa etsimään sitä ketun pesää. He olivat eksyneet ja päivän kävelleet, eivätkä olleet sitä sen koommin löytäneet.	That's where it ended for us and we came to the country road, and I said we should go again, so... Of course I knew he wouldn't like what I'd say but I couldn't keep myself from saying: "Let's go again on some Sunday". But he denied, saying he didn't really like hunting on Sundays. Next time, he had gone with two other men to look for the fox's nest. They had got lost and walked for a day, and never found it again.

== Culture ==
See: Kainuu#Tourism and culture.

=== Descriptions ===
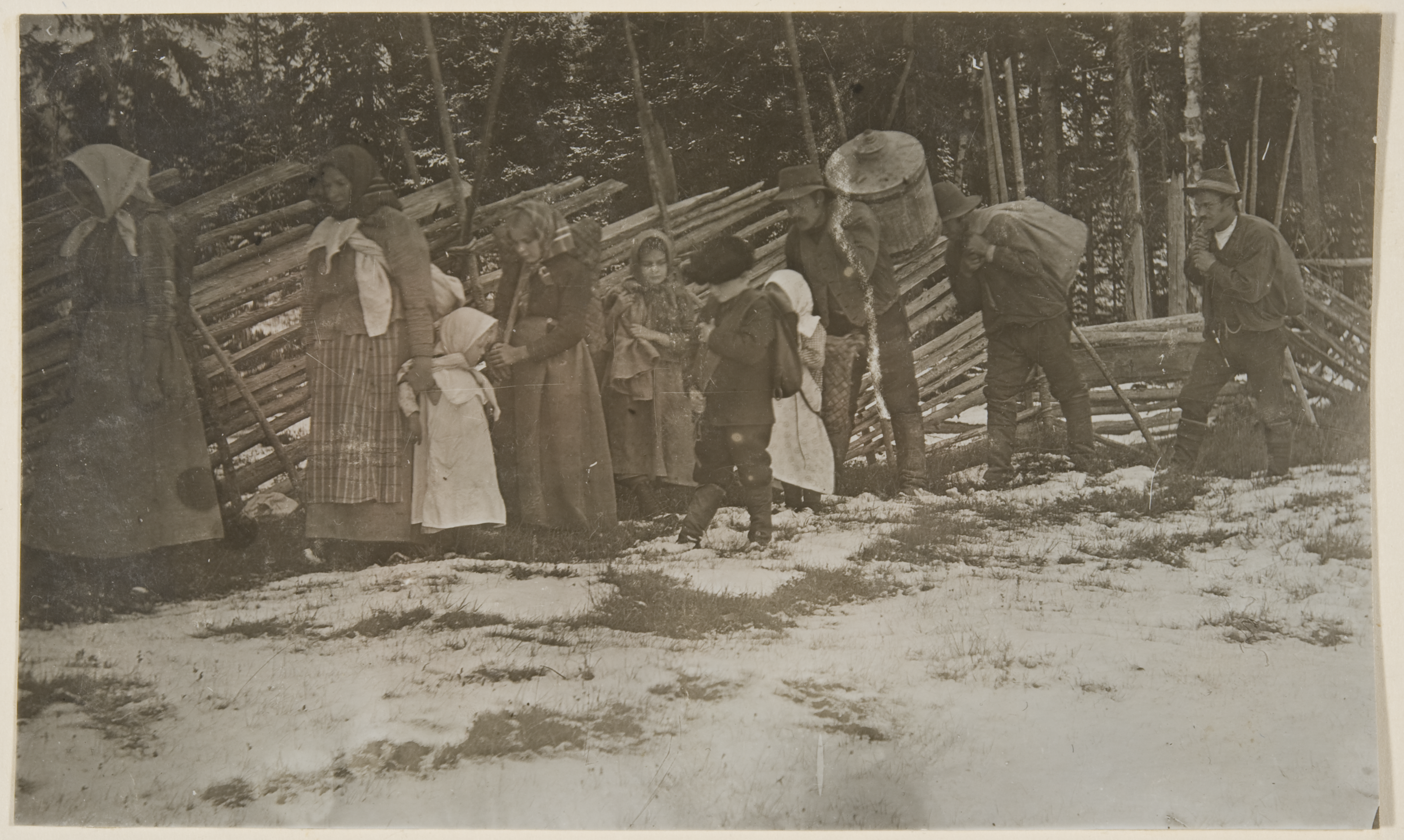
Carrying foodstuff and lamp oil in a region with no roads, Ristijärvi, 1912.

In the late 19th century and early 20th century, Kainuu was a poor region that had often suffered from famines. Kainuu got a reputation of being a "hunger land", which is reflected in the regional anthem of Kainuu, Nälkämaan laulu ("Song of the Hunger Land"). It was seen as a harsh place to live. On the other hand, these descriptions praised the striking nature of Kainuu, as well as the strength and sisu of the Kainuu people. Kainuu people have been described as honest, hard-working, quiet, independent, calm, lacking confidence, uncertain, polite, hospitable, and complaining. Bragging has traditionally been seen as a negative trait, possibly a factor in causing the perceived large amount of complaining instead. Kainuu people are also seen as being proud of their homeland and feeling a strong connection to it.

Authors from Kainuu have played a part in creating the impressions of Kainuu and its people. Author Ilmari Kianto, from Suomussalmi, often described the poor conditions of the Kainuu wilderness. Author Veikko Huovinen, from Sotkamo, described nature.

A letter sent to the newspaper Uusi Häme in 1938 by an anonymous girl from Kainuu described the Kainuu identity thus: "-- we, the current inhabitants of Kainuu would like to be our own tribe, even though we are a mix of Karelians and Savonians, possibly other tribes as well. -- A Kainuu person has a quiet and introverted personality. If you want to get to know them, they need to be approached, because a Kainuu person will not take the initiative in that matter. They will become friendly and warm when they consider the stranger their friend. -- If you understand a Kainuu person as sweet and ingenuous, you'll make friends that will never forget you."

=== Cuisine ===
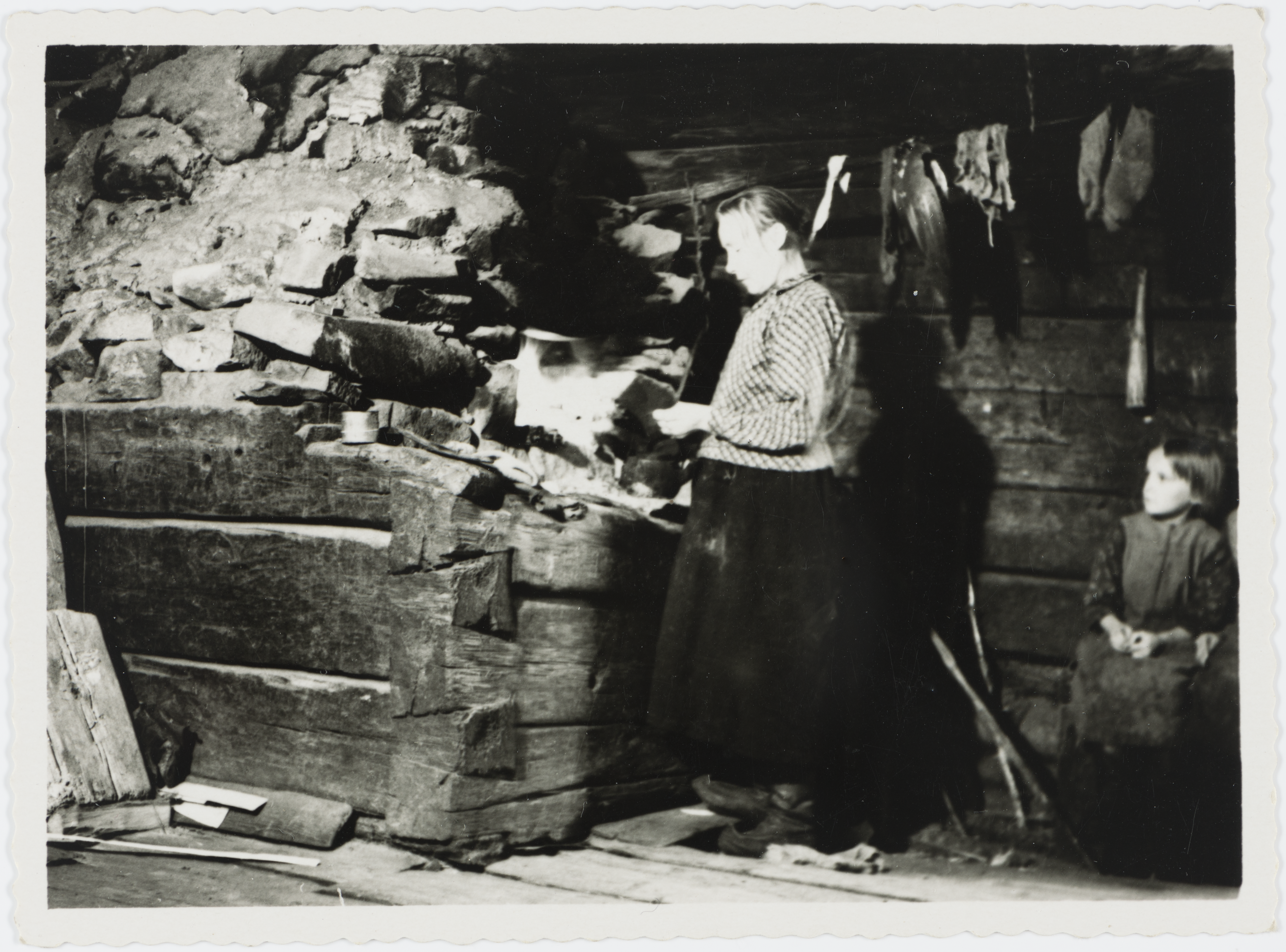
The stone oven of a log house in Kuhmo, 1930s.

The most important ingredients in traditional Kainuu food are fish, game (especially fowl), berries (especially blueberries, lingonberries and cloudberries), milk, butter, meat and blood. Most popular crops were barley, turnip and rye. Potato farming was also started relatively early. Mushrooms were not used in traditional Kainuu cuisine but have found their way on the plates of modern Kainuu people. During times of famine, people resorted to using tree bark (pettu) as an ingredient. Enough meat was saved to make it last through the winter, whereas milk was not always available. Bread also has an important role.

Kainuu houses traditionally had Eastern Finnish style ovens which food was prepared in, resulting in a wide variety of pies (teos), soft bread, kukko (fillings baked inside a loaf of bread) and other oven-made foods. Everyday food included fish or meat, and various kinds of soups (velli) were common. Finer foods for special occasions included talkkuna (talakkuna), roast, cardamom bread (nisu), juustoleipä, viili and rieska. Coffee was and is a popular drink.

Some foods traditional to Kainuu include rönttönen, juustoleipä, pöysti (meal made with beef, pork and lamb), ryynikukko (native Kainuu version of Karelian pasty), rye bread, potato milk (pottumaito), blood sausages, barley rieska, potato rieska, potato pie (pottuteos), various kinds of soups such as vendace and other fish soups, turnip and milk soup and sheep soup, various kinds of kukko such as kalakukko, open kukko, turnip and rutabaga kukko and potato kukko, as well as berry porridge and many other kinds of porridges, and cheeses.

=== National dresses and textiles ===
Kainuu women's and men's national dress on display at Kaukametsä Civic Centre in Kajaani.

National dresses in Finland are reconstructed from 18th and 19th century festive clothing used by commoners. The following national dresses have been reconstructed and officially recognized from Kainuu: Kainuu dress for women, Kainuu suit for men, and Suomussalmi dress for women.

Kainuu women's national dress was designed by Tyyni Vahter and released in 1947. The sewing patterns were checked for historical accuracy by craft teacher Eila Parviainen, applied arts bachelor Minna Meriläinen and homemade craft teacher Marja-Leena Pahkala. Kainuu men's national suit was officially accepted in 2001. Suomussalmi women's national dress was designed by Tyyni Vahter in 1953 based on materials collected by Selma Juntunen. One basis for the dress were U. T. Sirelius's descriptions of the Southern Lapland dress as it was based on a vest found from Hyrynsalmi.

Peilikäs is a raanu pattern which has become a symbol of Kainuu textile tradition. Originally used in blankets, it later spread to decorations such as pillowcases, carpets and sweaters.

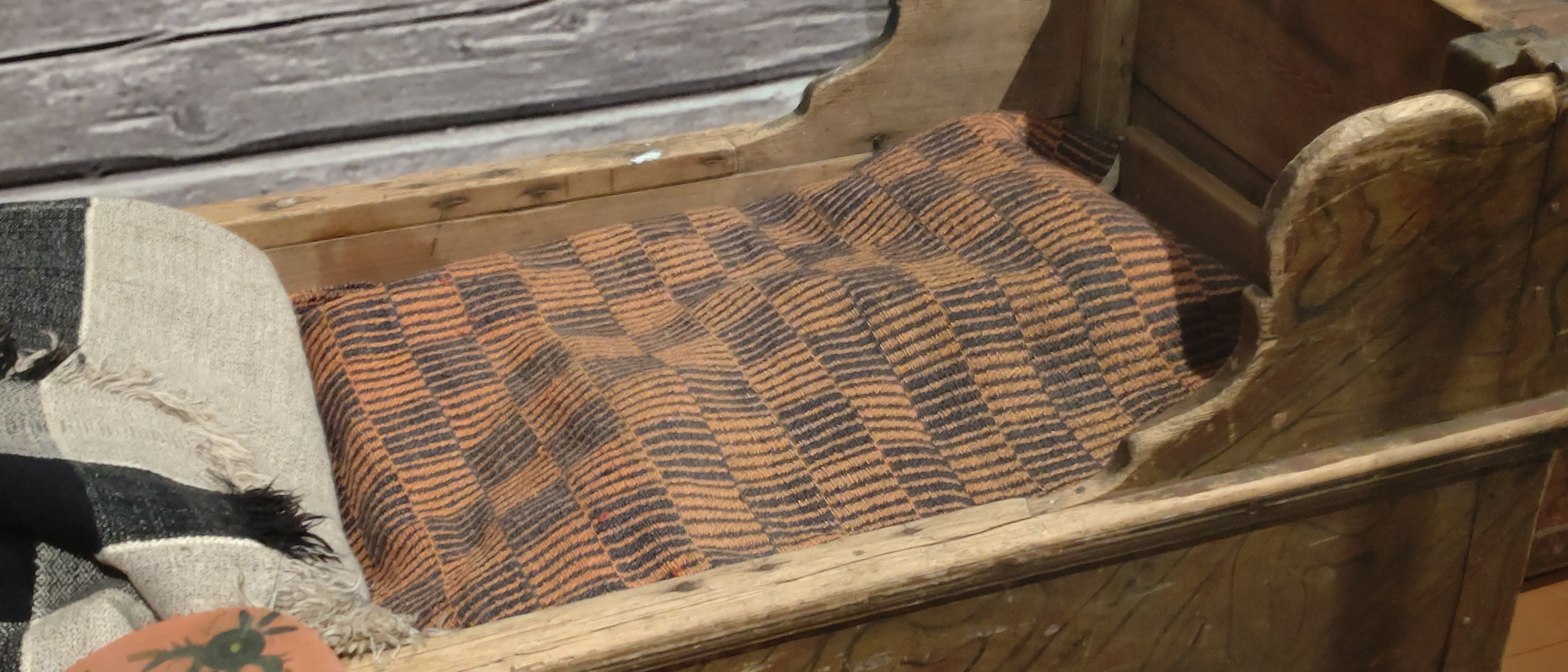
A blanket with the peilikäs pattern on display in Kainuu Museum.

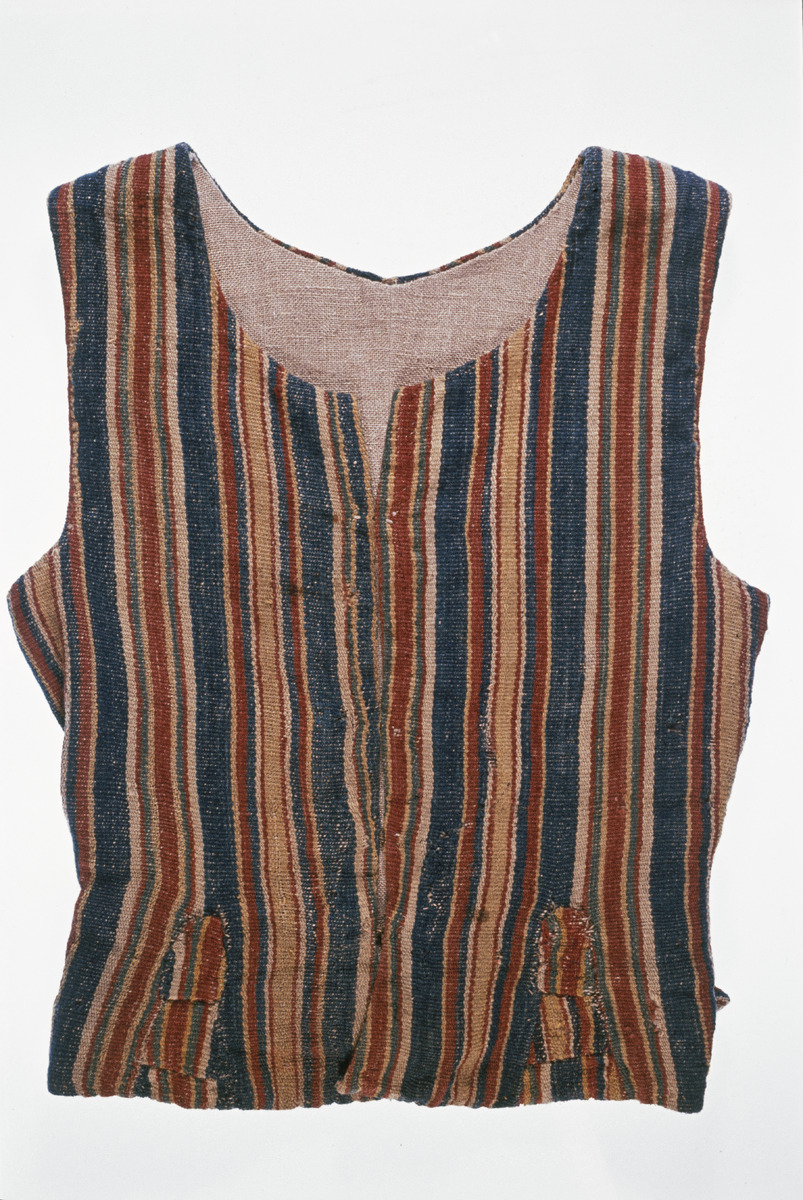
Traditional woman's vest found in Hyrynsalmi.

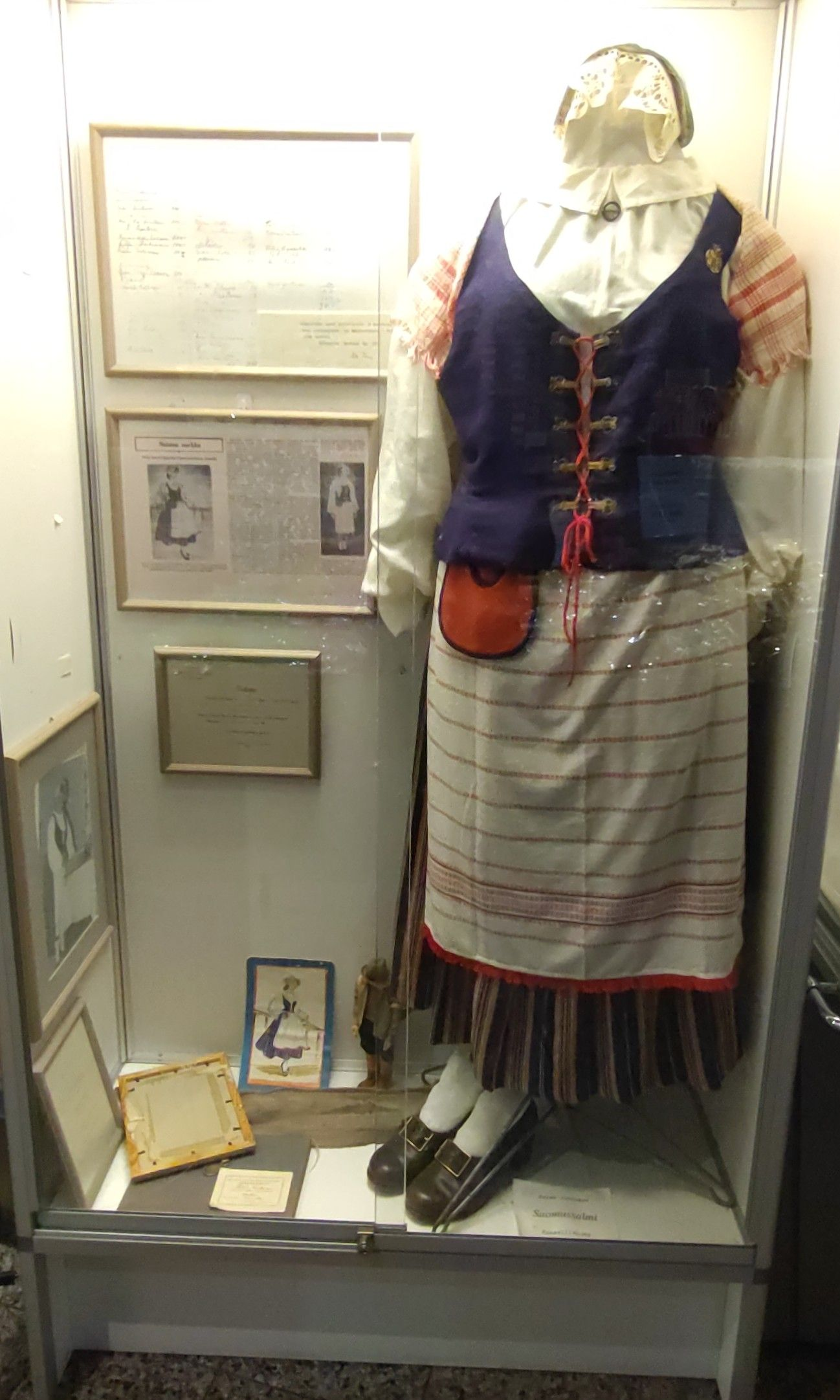
Suomussalmi women's national dress.

=== Festivals ===
The Finnish harvest festival Kekri is celebrated in Kainuu. Up until the early 20th century, Kekri was a more important holiday than Christmas. Christmas was seen more as a celebration of the upper classes, and Kekri held a meaning for the peasants. It was celebrated at the end of the harvest and included elements such as dressing up, fortune telling for the coming year, and burning bonfires. Due to urbanization, Kekri lost its importance, and many of the Kekri traditions have moved to now widely celebrated Christmas and New Year. The Finnish Father Christmas figure, Joulupukki, has his origins in a character called Kekripukki. Regardless of this, Kekri celebrations are still organized in Kainuu. Kajaani has been holding a Kekri celebration annually since 2002. This includes the burning of a Kekri goat (giant goat made out of straw), as well as music performances, art shows, catering, children's activities, markets, and other events depending on the year. The heavy metal concert KekriFest has also been held, for the first time in 2019.

In the modern day, festivities in Kainuu align largely with the rest of Finland. Traditionally, Kekri marked the turn of the year, and veneration of the dead was a major part of it. On November 11 was Martti (St. Martin's Day), Perso-Martti or makkarain päivä, a day for making and eating sausages. Between Kekri and Martti, the dead were on the move. On November 25 was Kaija (St. Catherine's Day) for sheep. Christmas was not considered an important holiday, but people still stopped working for the Christmas season and had something to eat, although less fancy compared to Kekri. Talkkuna was eaten on every celebration.

On New Years, molybdomancy was done to all humans, as well as the earth haltija, horses, cows and sheep. Shrove Tuesday was a big celebration full of eating and drinking, especially fatty foods and mämmi. On Easter, it was important to protect cattle with various kinds of magic spells, as well as chase away easter witches (pääsiäisämmä), and an evil spirit (kiira). On Vappu (Walpurgis Night), lamb and mutton had to be prepared, or the deeply jealous Walpurgis would not allow cattle to prosper. Midsummer was the most important celebration of the summer, with decorations of bird cherry flowers and birches. There were games, and girls tied colourful threads on rye straws to tell fortune: if the rye straw which grew the longest had a black thread, there would be sadness; red for happiness, blue for marriage, and white for death. Treasure could be found buried in the ground and the water of springs could turn into wine. Perttuli (Feast of Saint Bartholomew) in August was as important as Midsummer, known as a cheese holiday (juustopyhä) as cheeses were gives to the priest.

== Genetics ==
In Kainuu, Y-chromosomal (male lineage) haplogroup N1c1 has been observed with the frequency of 78%, and haplogroup I1 with 12.4%. The mitochondrial (mtDNA, female lineage) haplogroups with highest frequencies are H and U. According to Y-chromosomal DNA, most Kainuu families originate from South Savo, although some have taken a detour through North Ostrobothnia before settling in Kainuu. While the male lineages are eastern, there are connections to Western Finland through female lineages and mixing of families. Earlier, it was thought that Savo was populated mainly by South Karelians but DNA research has shown that under sixth of the population originates from Karelia and most are from Tavastia or belong to an older Sámi population in the region. Kainuu genes show further mixing between Savonians and Sámi.

== Famous Kainuu people ==
- Daniel Cajanus, giant
- Anders Chydenius, philosopher
- Veikko Huovinen, author
- Joonas Kemppainen, ice hockey player
- Marko Kemppainen, skeet shooter
- Ilmari Kianto, author
- Heikki Kovalainen, Formula 1 driver
- Anne Kyllönen, cross-country skier
- Merja Kyllönen, politician
- Jenna Laukkanen, swimmer
- Eino Leino, author and poet
- Laura Malmivaara, actress
- Väinö Markkanen, sports shooter
- Kaisa Mäkäräinen, biathlete
- Riku Nieminen, actor
- Janne Pesonen, ice hockey player
- Osmo Tapio Räihälä, composer
- Johan Gabriel Ståhlberg, priest
- K. J. Ståhlberg, 1st President of Finland
