= Kainuu dialect =

Dialect of Finnish

Kainuu
- Native to: Finland
- Region: Kainuu; North Ostrobothnia (partially); Lapland (partially)
- Ethnicity: Kainuu people
- Language family: Uralic: Finno-Ugric; Finnic; Northern Finnic; Finnish; Savonian dialects; Kainuu

Language codes
- ISO 639-3: –
- Glottolog: None
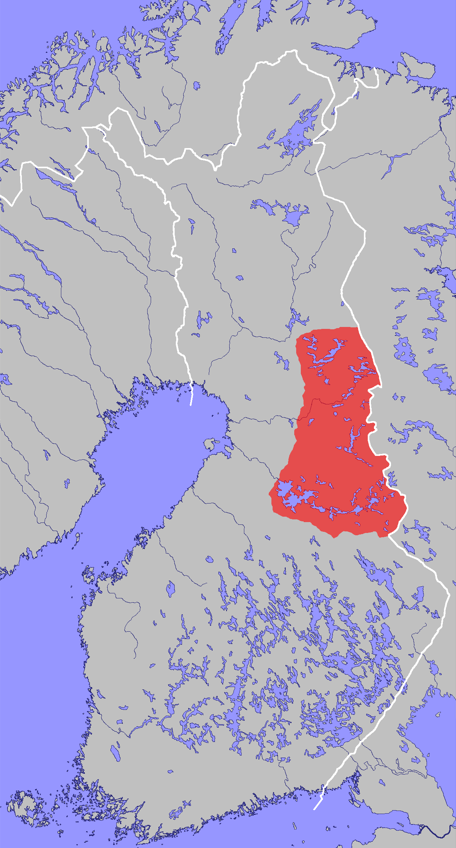
- The area in which Kainuu dialect is spoken.

The Kainuu dialect (Finnish: Kainuun murre) is a dialect of Finnish spoken in Kainuu, Vaala, Koillismaa, Posio and Ranua. It belongs to the Savonian dialects, or more broadly, the eastern dialects of Finnish. Due to the region's close ties to North Ostrobothnia, the dialect has been influenced in vocabulary by Central and Northern Ostrobothnian dialects and vice versa.

The Kainuu dialect can be divided into Northern, Central, and Southern groups. The Northern Kainuu dialect is spoken in Koillismaa, Posio and Ranua. The Central dialect is spoken in most of Kainuu, as well as in Vaala. The Southern dialect is spoken in Sotkamo and Kuhmo, in Southern Kainuu.

== Development ==
In the 16th century, people from Savonia, and later that century also Ostrobothnia, started moving to the Kainuu area. Most of them spoke Savonian dialects from Upper Savonia, and the Ostrobothnian arrivals spoke North Ostrobothnian dialects. This began Kainuu dialect's development as its own branch among the Savonian dialects. Already in the 16th century, the people of Kainuu began to have less contact with people of Savonia and more contact with people of North Ostrobothnia, solidified when the Kainuu area was made a part of Ostrobothnia County. Thus, the administrative and economic center for the Kainuu dialect area became the North Ostrobothnian city, Oulu. In Kainuu and Koillismaa, the North Ostrobothnian dialect was more respected than their own native Kainuu dialect.

The Kainuu dialect is the northernmost Savonian dialect. While it had begun its independent development in Kainuu, Pudasjärvi and Taivalkoski already in the 16th century due to Savonian migration, it only later spread to Kuusamo and Posio in the late 1600s due to Kainuu migration.

The term "Kainuu dialects" was only started to use after World War II. The border of western and eastern dialects of Finnish is not very strong in Kainuu and North Ostrobothnia, but both dialect groups have influenced each other in the area. Ostrobothnian influence is the strongest in the western parts of Vaala, and the second strongest in the Northern Kainuu dialects. The dialect of Sotkamo, on the other hand, has more Savonian features than anywhere else in Kainuu dialect area.

== Features ==
As typical for non-standard dialects of Finnish, the /d/ sound usually occurs as other consonants in the Kainuu dialect. For example, the word lehdet (/ˈlehdet/ ‘leaves’) occurs as /ˈlehet/, the word pöydät (/ˈpøy̯dæt/ ‘tables’) occurs as [ˈpøy̯ʋæt], the word hidas (/ˈhidɑs/ ‘slow’) sounds like [ˈhijɑs], and the word saada (/ˈsɑːdɑ/ ‘to get’) sounds like [ˈsɑːhɑ]. The affricate /ts/ present in the standard variety also occurs as different sounds, such as in [ˈmehtæ ~ ˈmetæn] (metsä ~ metsän, "forest") and [ˈohtɑ] for (otsa /ˈotsɑ/ ‘forehead’).

A common feature in the dialect are the occurrence of different diphthongs from standard Finnish. For instance, koira (/ˈkoirɑ/ dog) is [ˈkoe̯rɑ], Kainuu /kɑi̯nuː/ is [kɑe̯nuː], kaula (/kɑu̯lɑ/ neck) is pronounced [kɑo̯lɑ], and täysi (/ˈtæy̯si/ ‘full’) is [tæø̯si]. At the same time, long vowels that are present in the standard variety such as /æː/ in words like määrä /ˈmæːræ/, ‘quantity’) occur as [ˈmeæ̯ræ] in Kainuu Finnish. This diphthongization is, on the other hand, quite rare in nearby Vaala and Koillismaa.

Breaking of consonant clusters through vowel epenthesis is also common, such as in [ˈjɑlɑkɑ] for jalka /ˈˈjɑlkɑ/ ‘leg’). Consonant strengthening (or gemination) in intervocalic contexts is also very common in Kainuu dialects, such as [sɑnːoː] for sanoo [sɑnoː], ‘s/he says’) or [ˈmɑksetːɑːn] for maksetaan /ˈmɑksetɑːn/ (‘it is paid’).

However, many features that are common in other Savonian dialects are missing in Kainuu dialects. For example, Kainuu Finnish shows no palatalization at the end of words, nor are the personal pronouns [myø̯], [tyø̯] and [hyø̯] instead of me, te, and he /me te he/.

== Links ==
- Text and sound sample from Suomussalmi
- Texts and sound samples from Puolanka
