= Gustavus Adolphus Day =

Holiday in Sweden

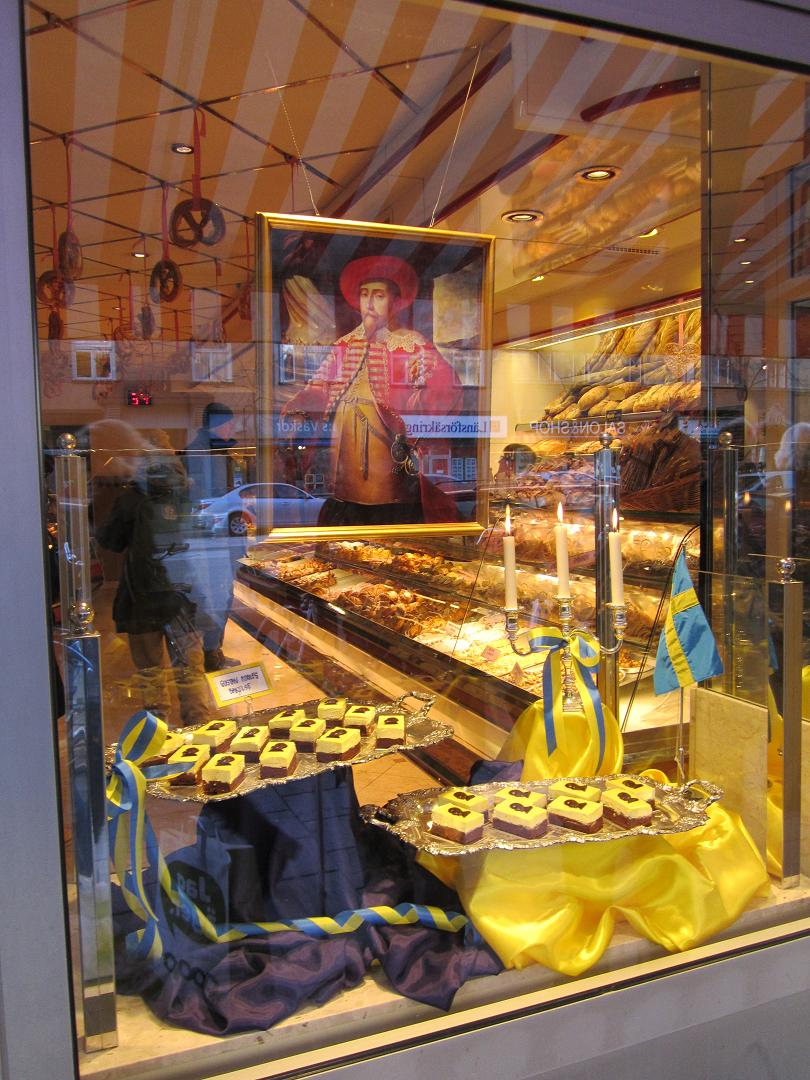
- Window of a pastry shop in central Stockholm with the king's portrait and Gustavus Adolphus pastries on 6 November 2012
- Observed by: Sweden
- Significance: Anniversary of the death of King Gustavus Adolphus of Sweden at the Battle of Lützen (1632)
- Date: 6 November
- Next time: 6 November 2026
- Frequency: annual
- Related to: Finnish Swedish Heritage Day

Gustavus Adolphus Day (Swedish: Gustav Adolfsdagen) is celebrated in Sweden on 6 November in memory of King Gustavus Adolphus. Observing the day became popular after 1832, the 200th anniversary of the king's death in 1632. It is a general flag flying day in Sweden. Today it is mainly connected with the consumption of Gustavus Adolphus pastries. In Finland, the Finnish Swedish Heritage Day is celebrated on the same date.

== Date ==
According to the Gregorian calendar, the king died on 16 November, but the Julian calendar ("old style") was still used in Protestant Sweden at the time and that date, 6 November, is still used.

== History ==
Gustavus Adolphus Day is celebrated in Sweden on 6 November in memory of King Gustavus Adolphus of Sweden, who was killed on that date (old style) in 1632 at the Battle of Lützen in the Thirty Years' War. The day is named for the king and is a general flag flying day in Sweden.

The day has been celebrated since the early 19th century and became especially popular after the 200th anniversary celebration in 1832, of the king's death. It was formerly celebrated with torchlight processions and patriotic speeches. Today what remains is mainly the consumption of the Gustavus Adolphus pastry (Gustav Adolfsbakelse in Swedish) on this day, with a chocolate or marzipan relief of that king on top. In Sweden, the day is especially observed in Gothenburg, which was founded by the king, but also in cities with old educational traditions, such as Uppsala, where he donated considerable funding to the university, and in cities where the military traditionally has been based.

The same day has been celebrated in Finland since 1908 by the Swedish speakers as Svenska dagen, Finnish Swedish Heritage Day. It is an established flag flying day in Finland since 1979. In Estonia, which like Finland was a part of Sweden during the reign of Gustavus Adolphus, the day is celebrated by the University of Tartu, which was founded under the name Academia Gustaviana during Gustavus Adolphus' reign. In all three countries, 6 November is the name day for Gustav Adolf, Gustavus Adolphus' name in Swedish, or Kustaa Aadolf, the name in Finnish.

Sjättenovembervägen ("Sixth November Road"), a part of the old Göta highway in the Stockholm borough of Älvsjö, is named for this day. According to the 1924 street naming committee, the road was the entry point into Stockholm for the king's funeral procession.
