= Gustavus Adolphus pastry =

Regional Swedish pastry

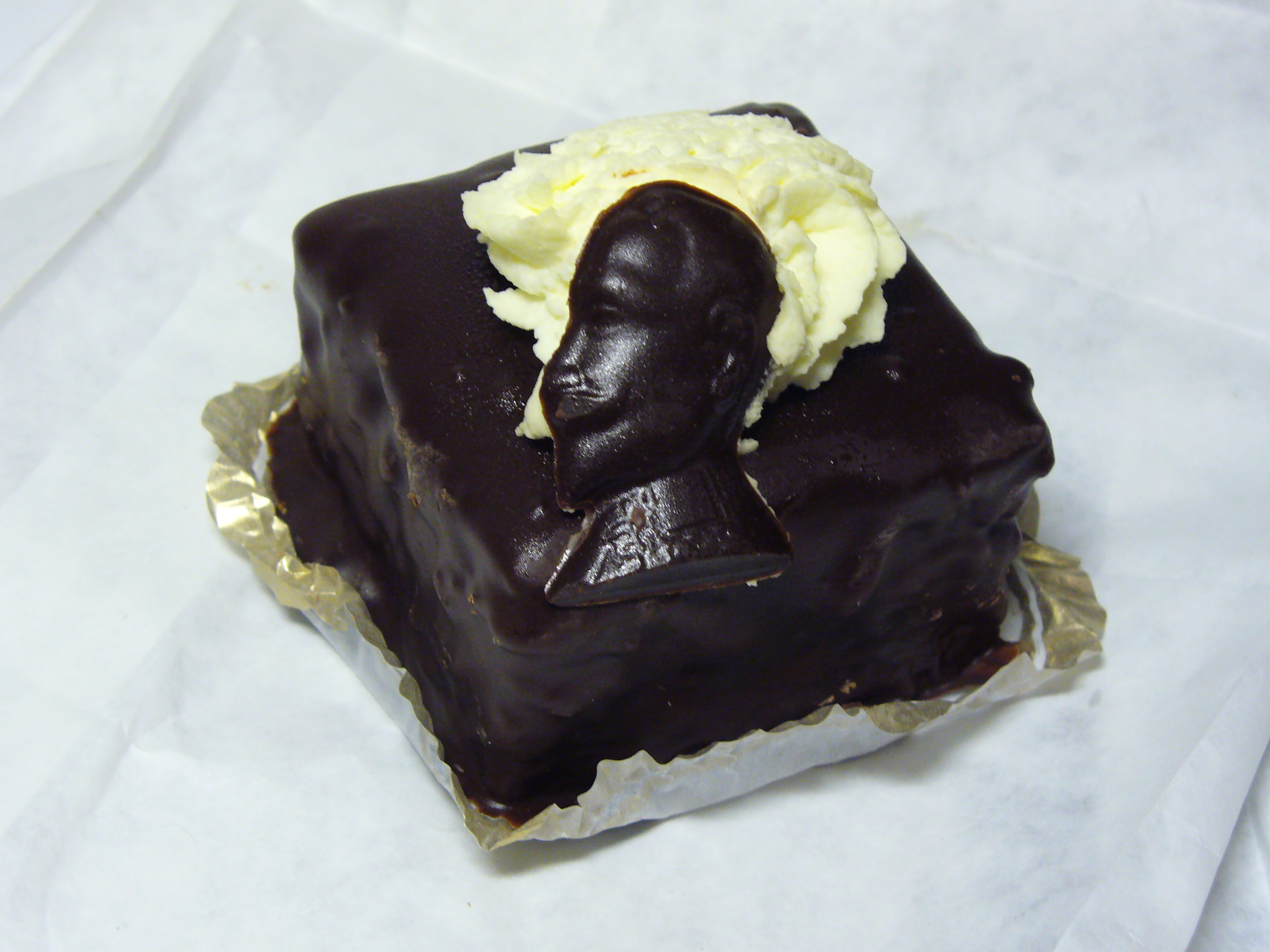
Gustavus Adolphus pastry, with the king's portrait.

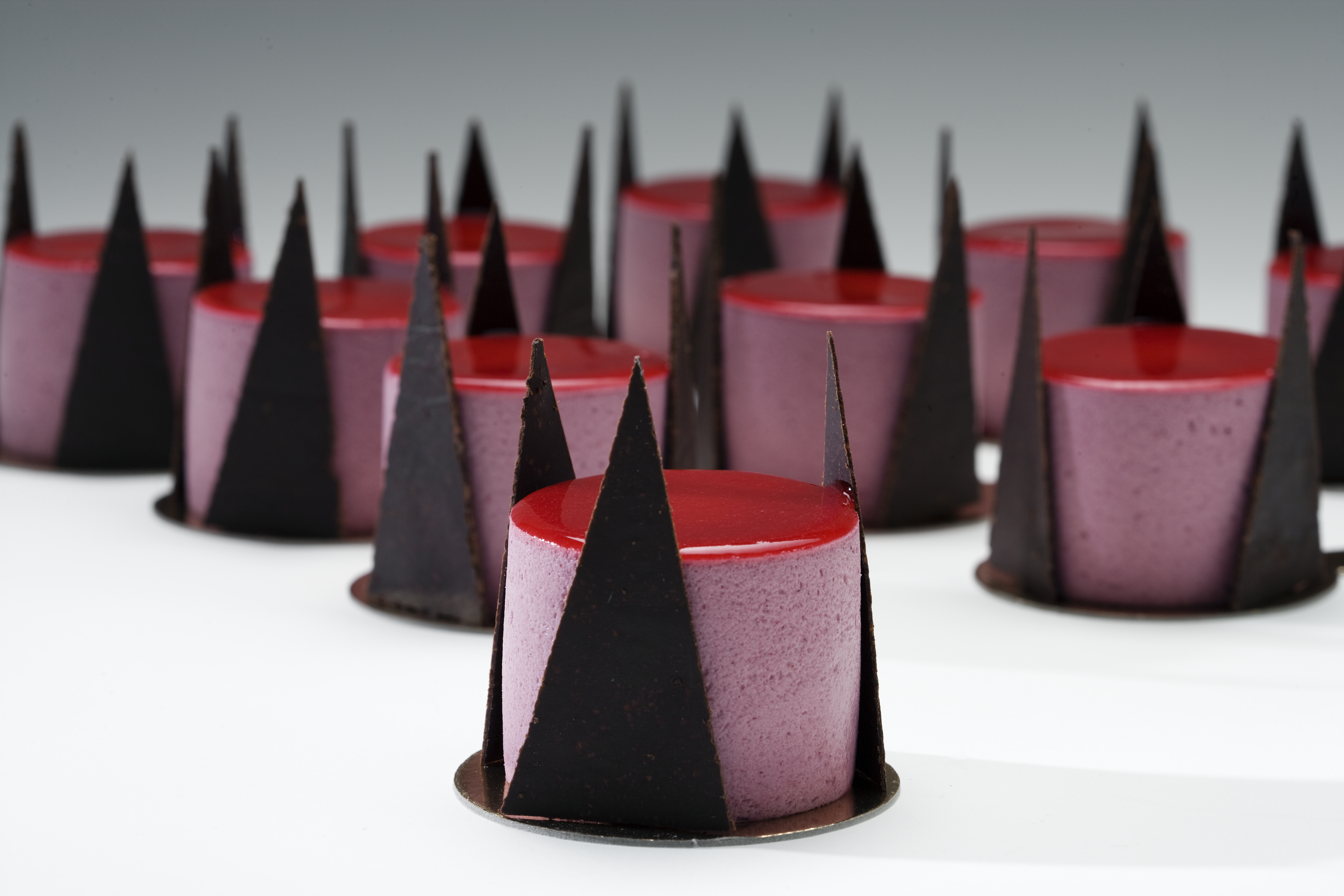
The winner of the 2003 competition.

Gustavus Adolphus pastry (Swedish: Gustav Adolfsbakelse) is a pastry traditionally eaten on 6 November in Sweden, Gustavus Adolphus Day, the death day of King Gustavus Adolphus. It is especially popular in Gothenburg, a city founded by the king.

The pastry was created around 1900. Candy with the image of the king was sold by a konditorei in Gothenburg since the 1850s. The earliest mention of a pastry is from the Western parts of Sweden during the 1890s, where the pastry probably was created around the festivities when a statue of the king was erected in Gothenburg on a square, that since then is known as Gustaf Adolfs torg ("Gustavus Adolphus Square"). One Gothenburg bakery, Bräutigams, claims to have created it in the early 20th century, with the years 1905 or 1909 mentioned.

Recipes for the pastry vary locally but most versions have a portrait of the king on the top, usually made of chocolate or marzipan. In 2003, a competition arranged by Livrustkammaren and Gastronomiska akademien ("Gastronomic Academy of Sweden") elected a winner without the king's portrait. The Swedish bakeries and konditoreis, however, preferred their old versions, so the attempt to establish a standard Gustavus Adolphus pastry failed. Exactly how many Gustav Adolphus pastries are sold in November each year is not known. The newspaper Göteborgs-Tidningen in 2009 approximated the total Swedish sales and consumption to more than 10,000.

== See also ==
- List of pastries
- Princess cake
