= Modersmålets sång =

English: 'The Song of the Mother Tongue'
- Melody with both stanzas, after Sånger för folkskolan (1929)
- Unofficial anthem of Swedish-speaking Finns
- Lyrics: Johan Fridolf Hagfors, 1897
- Music: Johan Fridolf Hagfors, 1897

Modersmålets sång (English: Song of the Mother Tongue) is a Finland Swedish song, which is also the unofficial anthem of Finland Swedes, however it is also played as a celebration song. The song is usually played on 6 November for Finnish Swedish Heritage Day. The song was composed by Johan Fridolf Hagfors in 1897 and performed for the first time on May 6, 1898, in University of Helsinki ballroom. The song was originally composed for the Akademiska Sångföreningen.

== Lyrics ==
Original Swedish language text

Hur härligt sången klingar

på älskat modersmål!

Han tröst i sorgen bringar,

han skärper sinnets stål!

Vi hört den sången ljuda

i ljuvlig barndomstid,

och en gång skall han bjuda

åt oss i graven frid!

Du sköna sång vårt bästa arv,

från tidevarv till tidevarv,

ljud högt, ljud fritt

från strand till strand

i tusen sjöars land!

Vad ädelt fädren tänkte,

vad skönt de drömt en gång,

det allt de åt oss skänkte

i modersmålets sång.

Hur våra öden randas,

den sången är oss kär,

Vår själ i honom andas,

vår rikedom han är!

Du sköna sång vårt bästa arv,

från tidevarv till tidevarv,

ljud högt, ljud fritt

från strand till strand

i tusen sjöars land!

== Score ==
Melody with both verses, after Sånger för folkskolan (1929).
