= En sommardag i Kangasala =

1864 song written by Zacharias Topelius and composed by Gabriel Linsén

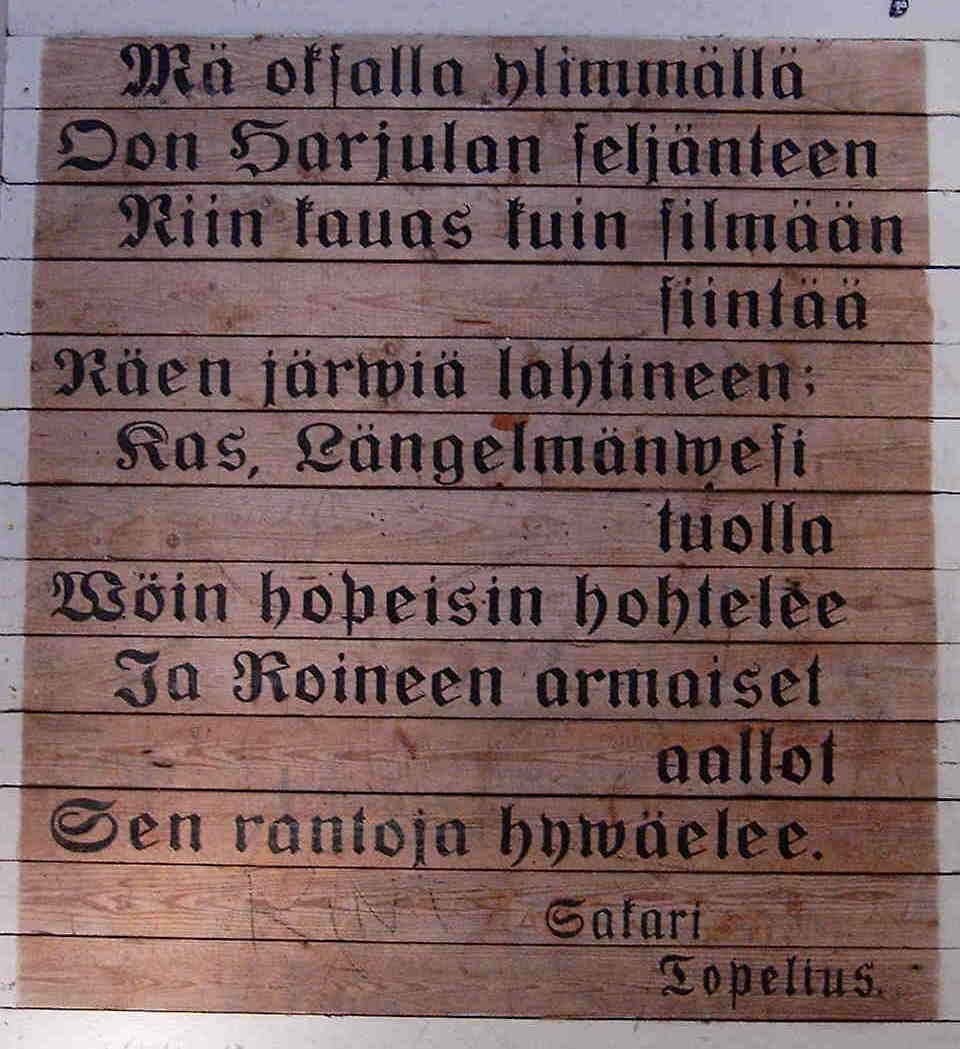
The words of the song Kesäpäivä Kangasalla painted on the tower of Haralanharju.

En sommardag i Kangasala (transl. Summer Day at Kangasala, Finnish: Kesäpäivä Kangasalla), also known as Jag gungar på högsta grenen (Finnish: Mä oksalla ylimmällä), is a poem written in Swedish by Zachris Topelius in 1853. Gabriel Linsén set it to music in 1864. It was made into the regional anthem of Pirkanmaa, Finland in 1995, in its Finnish translation.

The poem was first published in 1853 in the newspaper Helsingfors Tidningar (while Topelius was editor), and in 1854 as part of Sylvia's songs in the collection Ljungblommor, part III.

== Text ==
Swedish lyrics

Jag gungar i högsta grenen af Harjulas högsta ås;
vidt skina de blåa vatten, så långt de af ögat nås.
Af Längelmänvesis fjärdar där skimrar ett silfverband,
och Roines älskliga vågor i fjärran kyssa dess strand.

Och blå som en älsklings öga och klar som ett barndomshem
den gungande Vesijärvi sig stilla smyger till dem.
Och hundrade öar simma allt uti dess vida famn,
naturens gröna tankar i blåa vågornas hamn.

Men rundtkring de täcka stränder stå furor i dyster krans,
allt som den vise betraktar de jollrande barnens dans.
Och skördarnas tegar luta mot dem sin böljande kind,
och ängarnas blommor andas sin doft i sommarens vind.

O hur det fattiga Finland är rikt på skönhet ändå!
O hur af guld och af silfver dock stråla dess sjöar blå!
Här ha i sorg och i glädje sin lyra sångerna stämt
och härma i stilla gungning de klara sjöarnas skämt.

Jag är blott en liten fågel med späda vingar och små;
men vor' jag en örn i molnen, jag flöge högt i det blå,
och flöge och flöge vida allt upp till Guds allmakts tron
och sjönke där för hans fötter och kvittrade så min ton:

Du helige himlens Herre, hör lilla fågelens bön:
ack, hur är din jord så ljuflig! Hur är din himmel så skön!
O låt våra sjöar stråla klart uti vår kärleks brand!
O Herre, lär oss att älska, o lär oss älska vårt land!

Finnish lyrics

Mä oksalla ylimmällä oon Harjulan seljänteen;
niin kauas kuin silmään siintää, nään järviä lahtineen.
Kas Längelmävesi tuolla vöin hopeisin hohtelee,
ja Roineen armaiset aallot sen rantoa hyväelee.

Kuin lemmikin sulosilmä, niin kirkas, niin sininen,
on välkkyvä Vesijärvi, mi hiljalleen keinuen
tuoll’ hiipivi heidän luokseen ja satoja saariaan.
Niin helläst’ tuuditteleepi kuin emonen lapsiaan.

Vaan ympäri lehtorantain on hongikko mietteissään
ja vanhuksen lailla katsoo kuin lapset lyö leikkiään.
Ja peltojen laihot heitä ne tervehtii aaltoillen,
ja niityn kukkivat nurmet luo tuoksuja tuulehen.

Mik’ aarre, oi köyhä Suomi, ois sulosi vertainen!
Tuon järvies sinivälkkeen, tuon hopeisen kultaisen!
Jos murhe tai riemu nostaa tääll’ lauluhun säveleet,
niiss’ ainiaan kuvastuupi nää kirkkahan-sinervät veet.

Mä vain olen lintu pieni ja siipeni heikot on;
vaan oisinko uljas kotka, niin nousisin lentohon,
ja nousisin taivoon asti luo Jumalan istuimen
ja nöyrin, hartahin mielin näin laulaisin rukoillen:

Oi taivahan pyhä Herra, sä Isämme armias!
Ah kuink’ on sun maasi kaunis, kuink’ ihana taivahas!
Sä järveimme säihkyellä suo lempemme tulta vaan.
Oi Herra intoa anna ain maatamme rakastamaan.

== See also ==
- Kangasala
