= Finland-Swedish Heritage Day =

Flag flying day in Finland

- Flag of the Swedish-speaking Finns
- Official name: Swedish: Svenska dagen, Finnish: Ruotsalaisuuden päivä
- Observed by: Finland
- Significance: celebration of the Finland-Swedish heritage and culture of Finland
- Date: 6 November
- Next time: 6 November 2026
- Frequency: annual
- Related to: Gustavus Adolphus Day (Sweden)

Finland-Swedish Heritage Day, also known as the Swedish Day (Swedish: svenska dagen, Finnish: ruotsalaisuuden päivä), is a general flag flying day, which is celebrated in Finland on 6 November. The day celebrates the Swedish-speaking population of Finland, their culture, and the bilinguality of Finland. The main celebrations are aired on the radio, and many smaller celebrations are held around Finland in schools. Usually, the song Modersmålets sång is sung, celebrating the mother tongue. The Finland-Swedish Heritage Day is celebrated on the same day as Gustavus Adolphus Day in Sweden, the day that king Gustavus Adolphus of Sweden was killed at the Battle of Lützen in 1632.

The Finland Swedish Heritage Day was created in 1908, when the newly founded Swedish People's Party of Finland decided to celebrate a day for the Swedes. The intention was to strengthen the Finland-Swedish community. The reason why the day of the death of king Gustavus Adolphus was chosen was because this also was the time when the empire of Sweden was founded. In the beginning, the celebrations largely circled around the king's persona. During the language strife of the 1930s the celebrations were overshadowed by street fights between Finnish and Finland-Swedish groups. Finnish-speaking students saw this day as a day for celebrating "aggressive imperialism". During the Second World War, both sides stopped fighting each other and emphasized that both language groups were part of Finland, thus the celebration of the day spread outside the political spectrum. The figure of Gustavus Adolphus was also toned down over time and does not feature in present-day celebrations. Today, the day is led by Swedish Assembly of Finland. The day is an official flag-flying day in Finland since 1979.
