= Klemetti Eerikinpoika =

Klemetti Eerikinpoika (Swedish: Clemens Eriksson) was a Kainuu peasant and war leader during the pillaging wars (rappasodat, 1570–1595), during which Karelians on one side and Kainuu people and Ostrobothnians on the other waged guerrilla warfare against each other. He participated in campaigns led by Pekka Vesainen and later led them himself after Vesainen's death. He also led the defences around Oulujärvi when Karelians attacked. According to stories, he travelled to Stockholm to tell King Charles IX of Sweden about the dangerous conditions of the Kainuu region and as a result, the Kajaani Castle was built to defend the area. Klemetti Eerikinpoika was named the provost of the castle. He is known to have lived in Kajaani and Sotkamo.
