= Nälkämaan laulu =

Finnish poem by Ilmari Kianto

Nälkämaan laulu (meaning "Song of the Hunger Land") is a Finnish poem by Ilmari Kianto. It was turned into a song by Oskar Merikanto, and this song is the regional anthem of the Kainuu region. The song was first performed in 1911. A Swedish translation of the lyrics was made by Kianto's daughter Raija-Liisa Kianto in 2005, named Hungerlandets sång.

The lyrics describe the natural beauty of Kainuu, the hard-working nature (see sisu) of the Kainuu people, and their pride of their homeland.

== Text ==
Finnish

Kuulkaa korpeimme kuiskintaa,
jylhien järvien loiskintaa!
Meidänpä mainetta mainivat nuot
koskien ärjyt ja surkeat suot!
Meidänpä vapautta vaarat on nää!
Meidän on laulua lahtien pää!
Meille myös kevätkin keijunsa toi,
rastas ja metso täälläkin soi.

Taival lie hankala – olkoon vaan!
Luonto lie kitsas – siis kilpaillaan!
Kolkassa synkeän syntymämaan
pirttimme piilköhöt paikoillaan!
Vainojen virmat, oi vaietkaa!
Rapparit, ryöstäjät, kaijotkaa!
Miekkaa ei tarvis – tarmoa vaan
puolesta hengen ja heimon ja maan.

Nosta jo rintaasi maausko uus,
taannuta taika ja vanhoillisuus!
Maamies, muista, miss’ onnesi on,
riihesi rikkaus riippumaton!
Kainuhun kansa, ah arpasi lyö!
Missä on ryhtisi, kunnia, työ?
Meidän on uudesta luotava maa,
raukat vaan menköhöt merten taa!

Translation:
Swedish

Lyssna till vildmarkens mäktiga sus
i ändlösa kärren och forsarnas brus!
Vågen som slår mot vår ödsliga strand
sjunger om oss, om vårt öde, vårt land.
Friheten högt uppå höjderna bor
I sjöarnas vikar vi sjungande ror.
Våren ock hit med nymferna kom.
Trasten och tjädern här sjunger sin sång.

Färden är tung – så låt den förbli!
Naturen är karg – alltså kämpar vi!
Fjärran från allt på vår fädernejord
i stugornas trygghet och värme vi bor
Ofredens plågor tas inte emot
rappare, rövare, bort med ert hot!
Vapen behövs ej, blott ande och hand
försvarar vårt folk och vårt fäderneland!

Låt nyvunnen tillit nu fylla vårt bröst!
Trolldom och vantro förlore sin röst.
Lantman, du minns väl var lyckan din bor:
I rian göms skatten, där friheten gror.
Kajanalands folk, nu nalkas din stund!
Var är din resning, din heder och grund?
Här vill vi leva och bygga vårt land –
blott feglingar flyr till främmande strand!
