= Johan Fridolf Hagfors =

Finnish journalist, music critic and composer (1857–1931)

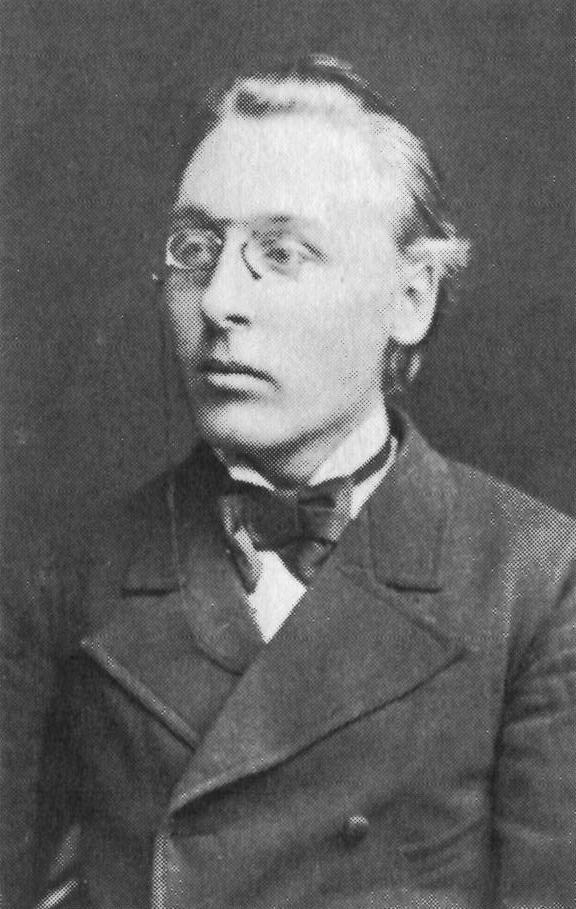

Johan Fridolf Hagfors (11 March 1857 – 18 August 1931) was a Finnish newspaper publisher, music critic and composer, most known for having composed the two songs Modersmålets sång (The mother tongue's song) and Ålänningens sång (Song of the Ålender).

Born in Orimattila, he got a Cand.phil degree in 1881. In 1883, he became publicist of the small Åbo paper Turun Lehti which was published in Finnish but at the same time Svecoman; it became the only newspaper with that combination to reach a wide readership. He also worked as a teacher in Åbo.

He composed several songs for male quartets. Modersmålets sång was first performed in 1889 and is today considered an unofficial hymn for the Swedish-speaking population of Finland. Ålänningens sång, for which he composed the melody, was first performed during the song festival in Mariehamn in 1922 and is today the regional hymn for Åland.

In 1912, he became a member of the Royal Swedish Academy of Music.

Due to stiff competition, Turun Lehti ceased publication in 1919. Hagfors subsequently moved to Stockholm and obtained Swedish citizenship. He died in 1931. Fellow composer Erik August Hagfors was his half-brother.

== Publications ==
- Förgätmigej (1879)
- Ann Mari (1897)
- Beatrici Canci (1902)
- En versbok (1918)
