= Kaukametsä Civic Centre =

Kaukametsä Civic Centre is part of the educational division of the town of Kajaani in Finland. The centre specialises in promoting lifelong learning and education. Location The Kaukametsä Civic Centre offers services in the town of Kajaani. In addition to the Kaukametsä premises, teaching takes place in about 50 different locations, including suburban and more sparsely settled areas of the town. History The history of the Kaukametsä Civic Centre reaches back to year 1920, when the Kajaani Citizens’ Institute was founded. The operations of the institute were discontinued in 1932 due to lack of funds during the Depression. The Civic Centre was founded in 1971 in the Kajaani rural commune. This centre became the Civic Centre of Kajaani when the town and rural commune were united in 1977. The Civic Centre moved to its current premises in Kaukametsä in 1987. Central values of the Civic Centre Easy access to services and freedom of choice, inexpensive services, promotion of sustainable development, lifelong learning, diversity as a gift, increasing goal, consciousness, promotion of mental and material welfare of individuals and the community, Field of operations

1. open adult education
2. open university in co-operation with local university branches and various other universities
3. basic art education art and handicraft courses and music courses for children and young visual arts for adults
4. upper secondary school subjects
5. special services personnel training, training for the unemployed, courses for students of other educational institutes, Finnish for foreigners courses
6. renting out of facilities classrooms and an eighty-seat auditorium are rented out for lectures, courses and meetings

Division of subjects Teaching in Kaukametsä Civic Centre is divided into the following Departments: Social subjects, languages, speech and drama, textile work, metal work and woodwork, nutrition and health education, visual arts, literature, dance and music.
