= Ålänningens sång =

Regional anthem of Åland, Finland

English: 'Ålander's Song'
- Ålands flagga
- Regional anthem of Åland
- Also known as: "Ahvenanmaalaisten laulu"
- Lyrics: John Grandell
- Music: Johan Fridolf Hagfors
- Adopted: 1922; 104 years ago

Audio sample
- Instrumental rendition in E-flat major: file; help

"Ålänningens sång" (lit. 'Ålander's Song') is the official regional anthem of Åland, an autonomous Swedish-speaking province of Finland. Adopted in 1922, the anthem's lyrics were written by John Grandell, and the music was composed by Johan Fridolf Hagfors. The song was first performed during the song festival in Mariehamn 1922. In Åland, the song is mostly sung on Midsummer's Eve and on Åland's Autonomy Day on 9 June.

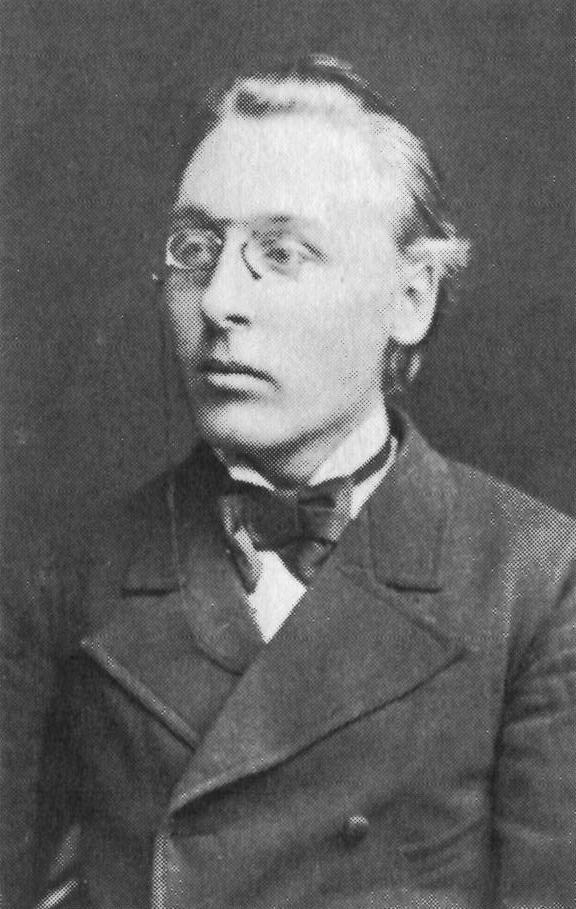
The composer of the anthem, Johan Fridolf Hagfors, sometime in the early 20th century.

== History ==
"Ålänningens sång" was first written by John Grandell in 1922 when he was visiting Skansen in Stockholm, Sweden. It was shortly after Åland had been granted self-government under Finnish authority but with their Swedish culture respected. Grandell was asked by Johannnes Eriksson to write a song for Ålanders to rally around as a distinct symbol. It was first performed at a national song festival in Mariehamn. Grandell was inspired to write it due to his mother being from Åland and he wanted to pay tribute to her and her homeland through "Ålänningens sång".

The song originally had four verses, but the third verse had been omitted for a long time when the song is sung and often when it appears in print. The reason for the omittance of the fourth was given by Grandell as for timing so the song was not too long. However, it has been argued by critics that the reason was it was because it was too political in terms of the verse being a lament to the Swedish language. In tribute to the composition of the music, the Hagfort Medal is awarded yearly by Friends of Swedish Schools.

== Lyrics ==
Swedish original
IPA transcription (Note: See Help:IPA/Swedish, Swedish phonology and Åland dialects.)

Landet med tusende öar och skär,
danat ur havsvågors sköte.
Åland, vårt Åland, vår hembygd det är.
Dig går vår längtan till möte!
Forngravars kummel i hängbjörkars skygd
tälja din tusenårs saga.
Aldrig förgäta vi fädernas bygd,
𝄆 vart vi i fjärrled än draga. 𝄇

Skönt är vårt Åland när fjärdar och sund
blåna i vårljusa dagar,
ljuvt är att vandra i skog och i lund,
i strändernas blommande hagar.
Midsommarstången mot aftonröd sky
reses av villiga händer,
ytterst i utskärens fiskareby
𝄆 ungdomen vårdkasar tänder. 𝄇

Skönt är vårt Åland när vågsvallet yr
högt mot de mäktiga stupen
när under stjärnhimlen kyrkfolket styr
över de islagda djupen.
Ryter än stormen, i stugornas ro
spinnrocken sjunger sin visa
minnet av barndomens hägnande bo
𝄆 sönerna lyckligast prisa. 𝄇

Aldrig har åländska kvinnor och män
svikit sin stam och dess ära;
ofärd oss hotat, men segervisst än
frihetens arvsrätt vi bära.
Högt skall det klinga, vårt svenska språk,
tala med manande stämma,
lysa vår väg som en flammande båk,
𝄆 visa var vi äro hemma. 𝄇

[ˈlanː.dɛt meː(d) ˈtʉː.sɛn.dɛ ˈøː.ar ɔ(kː) ɧæːr]
[ˈdɑː.nat ʉːr ˈhɑːvs.voː.ɡɔʂː ˈɧøː.tɛ]
[ˈoː.lɑnd voːrt ˈoː.lɑnd voːr ˈhɛm.bʏɡːd deː(t) æːr]
[d(ɛ)i ɡoːr voːr ˈlɛŋ.tan tɪl ˈmøː.tɛ ‖]
[ˈfuːɳ.ɡrɑː.vaʂː ˈkʉm.mɛl iː ˈhɛŋː.bjœːrː.kaʂː ɧʏɡːd]
[ˈtɛlː.ja dɪn ˈtʉː.sɛ.nɔʂː ˈsɑː.ga]
[ˈal.dri fœr.ˈjɛː.ta viː ˈfɛː.dər.nas bʏɡːd]
𝄆 [ˈvart viː iː ˈfjæːr.leːd ɛnː ˈdrɑː.ga ‖] 𝄇

[ɧœnt æːr voːrt ˈoː.lɑnd næːr ˈfjæːr.dar ɔ(kː) sɵnd]
[ˈbloː.na iː ˈvoːrl.jʉː.sa ˈdɑː.gar]
[jʉvt æːr atː ˈvan.dra iː skuːɡ ɔ(kː) iː lɵnd]
[iː ˈstrɛn.dər.nas ˈblʊm.man.dɛ ˈhɑː.gar ‖]
[ˈmiːd.sɔm.mar.ˌstɔŋ.ɛn muːt ˈaf.ton.røːd ɧyː]
[ˈreː.sɛs ɑːv ˈvil.li.ga ˈhɛn.dər]
[ˈʏt.tɛʂːt iː ˈʉːt.ɧæː.rɛns ˈfis.ka.rɛ.ˌbʏ]
𝄆 [ˈʉŋ.doː.mɛn ˈvoːrd.kɑː.sar ˈtɛn.dər ‖] 𝄇

[ɧœnt æːr voːrt ˈoː.lɑnd næːr ˈvoːɡs.val.lɛt yːr]
[hœgt muːt diː ˈmɛk.ti.ga ˈstʉː.pən]
[næːr ˈɵn.dɛr ˈɧæːɳ.him.lɛn ˈkʏrk.fɔl.kɛt styːr]
[ˈøː.vær diː ˈis.lɑːɡ.da ˈjʉː.pən ‖]
[ˈrʏː.tər ɛnː ˈstɔr.mən iː ˈstʉː.goː.ɳas roː]
[ˈspɪnː.rɔk.kɛn ˈɧɵŋː.ɛr sɪn ˈviː.sa]
[ˈmin.nɛt ɑːv ˈbɑːɳ.doː.məns ˈhɛŋ.nan.dɛ buː]
𝄆 [ˈsøː.nɛr.na ˈlʏkː.li.ɡast ˈpriː.sa ‖] 𝄇

[ˈal.dri(g) hɑːr ˈoː.lɛnd.ska ˈkvin.nʊr ɔ(kː) mɛn]
[ˈsviː.kɪt sɪn stam ɔ(kː) dɛs ˈæː.ra]
[ˈoː.fɛːrd ɔs ˈhoː.tat mɛn ˈseːɡɛr.vɪst ɛnː]
[ˈfriː.heː.tɛns ˈarvs.rɛtː viː ˈbæː.ra ‖]
[hœgt skal deː(t) ˈkliŋː.a voːrt ˈsvɛn.ska sproːk]
[ˈtɑː.la meː(d) ˈmɑː.nan.dɛ ˈstɛm.ma]
[ˈlʏː.sa voːr vɛːɡ sɔm ɛnː ˈflam.man.dɛ boːk]
𝄆 [ˈviː.sa vɑːr viː ˈæː.roː ˈhɛm.ma ‖] 𝄇

Finnish translation
English translation

Tuhannen saaren ja luodon maa,
Syntynyt syvältä aaltojen alta
Meidän Ahvenanmaa, kotimme se on
Me kaipaamme tavata.
Muinaisia hautoja koivujen alla
Kertoo tuhannen vuoden historiastamme
Emme koskaan unohda isiemme maata
𝄆 Ei ole väliä minne menemme. 𝄇

Ihana on Ahvenanmaamme lahdilla ja salmilla
Tule siniseksi kevään kirkkaina päivinä
On ihana vaeltaa metsässä ja lehdessä
Ranniememme kukkaisilla pelloilla.
Juhannusauvasta illan punaiselle taivaalle
Nostetaan halukkailla käsillä
Kauimpana kalastajakylässä
𝄆 Nuoret sytyttävät majakat. 𝄇

Ihana on Ahvenanmaamme, kun aaltojen vaahto
pyörii mahtavaa jyrää vasten
Kun kirkon ihmiset ohjaavat tähtien alle
Meren jäisten syvyyksien yli.
Jopa myrskyn pauhuessa mökkien rauhassa
Pyörivän pyörän laulu lauletaan
Muisto rakastavasta lapsuudesta on
𝄆 Pojat ylistivät onnellisesti. 𝄇

Älä koskaan ole Ahvenanmaan naisia ja miehiä
Heittäkää heimonsa kunnia alas
Sodankäynti uhkasi meitä, mutta voitollisesti
Meillä on vapauden perintö.
Äänekkäästi se kuulostaa, ruotsin kielemme
Kutsuvalla äänellä puhuttu
Valaise polkumme kuin liekkien merkintä
𝄆 Näytä meille, mihin kuulumme. 𝄇

Land of thousand islands and skerries
Born from deep beneath the waves,
Åland, our Åland, our home it is
Thee we long to meet.
Ancient graves beneath the birches
Tell of our thousand-year history,
Our forebears' land we shall never forget
𝄆 No matter whither we will get. 𝄇

Lovely is our Åland when straits and bays
Become blue in the bright spring days,
'Tis delightful to wander in forest and grove
In flowered fields of our shores and cove.
Midsummer pole to evening red sky
By willing hands raised high,
In skerry village far and about
𝄆 Lit are beacons by the young scout. 𝄇

Lovely is our Åland when froths of waves
Whirl 'gainst mighty precipice blades,
When the church folks steer beneath the stars
Over the icy depths of waters.
Even when storms in cottages' peace roar
The airs of spinning wheels soar,
In memory of loving childhood
𝄆 Thy children in gleeful praise stood. 𝄇

Never have Ålandic women and men
Let down the worth of their nation,
Warfare threatened us, yet gloriously
Freedom's heritage we carry.
Let our Swedish language be ablare
Spoken with voice urging and yare,
Like a buoy of flames may our path prolong
𝄆 To show us where we belong. 𝄇

== See also ==
- "Maamme"
- "Du gamla, Du fria"
