= Ostrobothnia County =

Province of the Kingdom of Sweden (1634–1775)

Ostrobothnia County Österbottens län Pohjanmaan lääni
- County of the Swedish Empire
- 1634–1775
- Capital: Vaasa
- History
  - Established: 1634
  - Disestablished: 1775
Succeeded by
Vaasa Province; Oulu Province

Ostrobothnia County (Swedish: Österbottens län, Finnish: Pohjanmaan lääni) was a county of the Swedish Empire from 1634 to 1775.

The county was split in 1755 to County of Vasa (Swedish: Vasa län, Finnish: Vaasan lääni) and County of Uleåborg (Swedish: Uleåborg län, Finnish: Oulun lääni).

== Maps ==
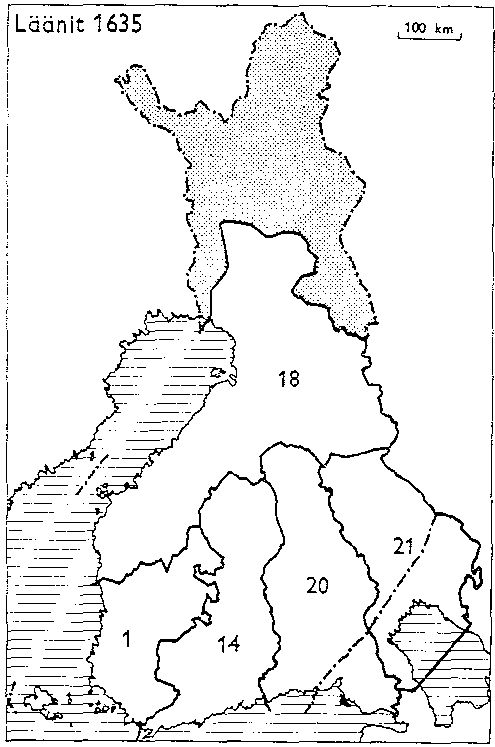
Provinces of Finland 1634: 1: Turku and Pori, 14: Nyland and Tavastehus, 18: Ostrobothnia, 20: Viborg and Nyslott, 21: Kexholm

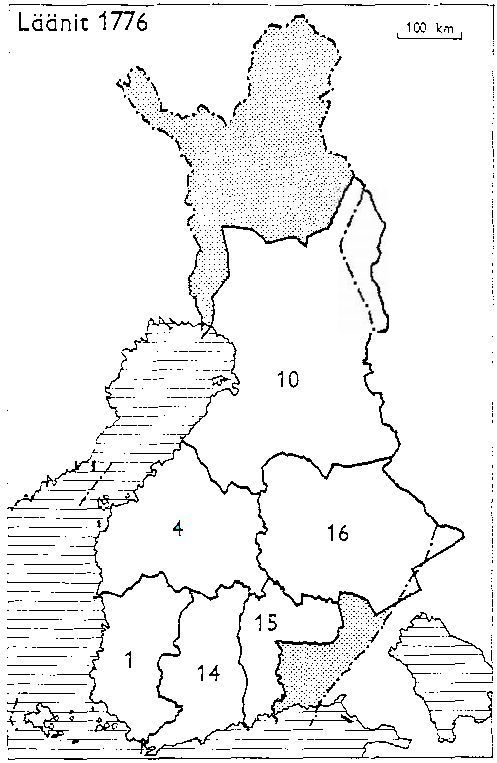
Provinces of Finland 1776: 1: Turku and Pori, 4: Vaasa, 10: Oulu, 14: Nyland and Tavastehus, 15: Kymmenegård, 16: Savolax and Karelia

== Governors ==
- Melcher Wernstedt 1635–1642
- Hans Kyle 1642–1648 (Vasa County)
- Erik Soop 1644–1648 (Uleåborg County)
- Hans Kyle 1648–1650
- Ture Svensson Ribbing 1650–1654
- Johan Graan 1654–1668
- Jacob Duwall 1668–1669
- Johan Graan 1669–1674
- Didrik Wrangel af Adinal 1674–1685
- Gustaf Grass 1685–1694
- Johan Nilsson Ehrenskiöldh 1694–1706
- Johan Stiernstedt 1706 (acting)
- Lorentz Clerk 1706–1720
- Reinhold Wilhelm von Essen 1720–1732
- Carl Henrik Wrangel af Adinal 1732
- Broor Rålamb 1733–1734
- Carl Frölich 1734–1739
- Gustaf Creutz 1739–1746
- Gustaf Abraham Piper 1746–1761
- Gustaf von Grooth 1761–1762
- Carl Sparre 1763
- Fredrik Henrik Sparre 1763
- Lorentz Johan Göös 1763–1774
- Fredrik Magnus von Numers 1774 (acting)
