= Tuulikki (spirit) =

Deity

- Daughter of Tapio & Mielikki; Mother of Squirrels
- Other names: Ingria: Annikka, Tulikka; Kainuu: Annikki; Karelia: Ainikki, Annatar, Anni, Ańńi, Annikki, Ańnikki, Aunikki, Lumikki, Mielineiti, Mielineito, Myyrikki, Ristikko, Taińikki, Tuurikki, Tynikki, Tyylikki, Tyynikki, Tyyri, Tyytikko; Ostrobothnia: Annikki, Tyytikki; Savo: Annikki
- Gender: Female
- Ethnic group: Finns, Karelians

Genealogy
- Parents: Tapio (father); Mielikki (mother)

Tuulikki is a forest haltija in Finnish mythology. She is called a daughter of Tapio & Mielikki. The variations of her name include Annikki (influenced by Saint Anne) and Tyytikki, the latter being called the mother of squirrels. She's also been connected to Karelian Lyylikki, "smith of skis" (lylyjen seppä).

== In runic songs ==
Beautiful Tuulikki, daughter of Tapio & Mielikki, was sitting on a rainbow in the sky. Väinämöinen arrived to propose to her but she said he needs to prove to her that he is a hero. She asked him to do impossible tasks, which he clears, but when he is asked to carve out a boat without hitting a rock with an axe, he ends up wounding himself in the toe, causing it to bleed.

In hunting spells, she is asked to help in hunting with words similar to what is asked from Mielikki and Tellervo.

Tapio's daughter or maiden is also called Tuometar (lit. 'Lady bird cherry') in runic songs. This name appears in Kainuu, Lapland, Norrbotten, North Karelia, North Ostrobothnia, North Savo and White Karelia, mainly in bear-related songs. She is sometimes called a mother (or one of them) of the bear. She has been considered a tree haltija, protector of the bird cherry, while Martti Haavio believed Tuometar is actually a synonym for Hongatar. Another name for Tuometar has been Kataatar, after Saint Catherine. A Western Finnish cattle song also asks Tuomen piika, metsän neitsyt (Maid of the bird cherry, maiden of the forest) to look after cattle.

== Name ==
The wide variety of different versions of her name in runic songs suggests the original name has become unclear. Haavio suggested the original form was *Lyyδikki, the initial having developed into a t-sound for alliteration with the word Tapio. In this case, the original word would be *lyyti, borrowed from Old Norse hluti 'lot, fate', which then developed to *lyyδi and eventually lyyli. Lyyli in Finnish means luck as well as a religious offer or sacrifice, and *Lyyδikki would've been someone who gave hunting luck.

== Epithets ==
Epithet	Epithet meaning	Regions
Annikka, Tapion tytär Annikki, tytär Tapion; Aunikki, tytär Tapion; Lumikki, tytär Tapion; Tuometar, tytär Tapion; Tuulikki, tytär Tapion; Tuurikki tytär Tapion; Tyytikko, tytär Tapion	'Tuulikki, Daughter of Tapio'	Ingria, Kainuu, Ladoga Karelia, North Karelia, Olonets Karelia, White Karelia
Taińikki, Tapion tyttö Tyylikki, Tapion tytti Tynikki Tapion tyttö Tyynikki, Tapion tyttö	'Tyynikki, Girl of Tapio'	White Karelia
Salakaaren kaunis vaimo Salokaaren kaunis vaimo Salakorven vaimo kaunis Salakaarron kaunis vaimo Salakaarten vaimo kaunis	'Beautiful woman of a secret arc' 'Beautiful woman of a wilderness arc' 'Beautiful woman of a secret wilderness' 'Beautiful woman of a secret curve' 'Beautiful woman of secret arcs'	Lapland, North Ostrobothnia, North Savo, White Karelia
Ainikki Tapion neiti Annikki, Tapion neiti Myyrikki, Tapion neiti Tuometar, Tapion neiti Tuulikki, Tapion neiti Tyytikki Tapion neiti	'Tuulikki, Miss of Tapio'	Kainuu, Lapland, North Ostrobothnia, Ostrobothnia, White Karelia
Annikki salon ania	'Annikki, tietäjä of deep forest'	North Savo
Annikki, jalo tapio	'Annikki, noble forest'	Kainuu
Annikki, neiti nuori	'Annikki, young miss'	Kainuu
Hoikka Honkelan miniä Hoikka Honkalan miniä	'Slim daughter-in-law of Honkala'	Lapland, North Ostrobothnia
Metsän piika pikkuruinen Meijän piika pikkarainen	'Tiny maid of forest' 'Our tiny maid'	Kainuu, North Karelia, North Ostrobothnia, North Savo, Olonets Karelia, White Karelia
Tuometar, tytär typerä	'Tuometar, foolish daughter'	White Karelia
Tuometar, hyvä emäntä	'Tuometar, good mistress'	North Savo
Tuometar, puhas emäntä	'Tuometar, pure mistress'	North Savo
(About Tuometar:) Päivälän miniä Päivölän miniä	'Daughter-in-law of Päivölä'	Kainuu
