= Hongatar =

Deity

- Mother of the Bear
- Other names: Central Finland: Hongas, Hongotar, Tapiatar; Karelia: Hongas, Honkatar, Tapiotar; Ostrobothnia: Hongas, Hongotar, Höngäs, Petäjätär; Savo: Hongas, Tapiotar
- Gender: Female
- Ethnic group: Finns, Karelians

Hongatar or Hongas is a haltija or goddess in Finnish mythology. She is known as the mother of the bear. After killing a bear, there was a ritual held called peijaiset, a funeral (sometimes staged like a wedding) for the bear where its skull was lifted on a large, straight pine tree (honka). Hongatar could be also imagined in bear-form, with her skull as the oldest one on the tree. She was the special, invited guest of these rituals.

== Name ==
Her name comes from honka, a pine tree, the very kind of tree where bear skulls were ritualistically lifted to hang on. Martti Haavio believed the honka in her name is the very first, mythical bear skull tree. In runic songs about the origin of the bear, many other tree related female haltija names are listed: Tuometar (lit. 'Lady bird cherry'), Katajatar (lit. 'Lady juniper'), Petäjätär (lit. 'Lady pine'), Pihlajatar (lit. 'Lady rowan'), and more. Haavio also believed these to not be separate tree haltijas, like many have done, but all be referring to Hongatar. Peijaiset ritual was also called Tuomettaren juomingit, Pihlajattaren pidot 'Drinking party of Tuometar, feast of Pihlajatar'.

If Haavio's theory, also repeated by onomatologist Sirkka Paikkala, is true, then Hongatar would gain the following alternate names: Tuometar in Kainuu, Norrbotten, North Karelia, North Savo, Olonets Karelia, Rear Bothnia and White Karelia; Tuonetar in Kainuu and Rear Bothnia; Tuomatar in Olonets Karelia; Taometar in Kainuu; Katajatar in Norrbotten, North Karelia and White Karelia; Pihlajatar in North Karelia, North Ostrobothnia and White Karelia; Putkitar (lit. 'Lady umberfiller') in North Karelia; Ryöhkötär (Note: In Kaarle Krohn's opinion, from röyhelöinen, making it Röyhkötär, roughly 'Lady fluff/ruffle') in Kainuu and Olonets Karelia; and Varvutar (lit. 'Lady shrub') in White Karelia.

The name Hongas was connected to Hongatar by Elias Lönnrot in 1874 for their similarities in sound as well as role in the runic songs.

Another name appearing as a synonym for Hongatar in runic songs is Tapiotar.

== In runic songs ==
It is said that bears are "of the family of Hongatar". Different names could be used to speak of the bear's parents, such as: "Hongatar is your father, / Tuometar is your mother", or "On your father's side Hongatar, / on your mother's side Ryöhkötär" or "from your father's side, Immitär, / from your mother's side, Hongatar". In a Kainuu song, "Ismärätär, girl of Tuoni" and Kavet are involved in the bear's creation process: Ismärätär gathered up water foam into a home made of bird cherry and cradled it, whereas Kavet gave this "child" gums and teeth from the forest trees, as well as a tooth which fell from the sky. Bear origin myths which combine Christian and ethnic tradition also combine the bear's origin in the sea and the sky.

One song states Mielikki brought up the bear under a spruce and then asks Tuometar and Mielikki to dull the bear's claws and cover its teeth with honey so it wouldn't hurt cattle.

== Epithets ==
Epithet	Epithet meaning	Regions
Hongatar, hyvä emäntä Honkatar, hyvä emäntä	'Hongatar, good mistress'	Forest Finns, Ladoga Karelia, North Karelia, North Savo, South Karelia, White Karelia
Hongatar, metän emäntä	'Hongatar, mistress of the forest'	North Karelia, North Ostrobothnia, South Savo
Hongatar, tytär Tapion	'Hongatar, daughter of Tapio'	North Karelia
Honkatar salon emäntä	'Honkatar, mistress of the wilderness'	North Karelia
Tapiotar, vaimo tarkka Tapiatar tarkka vaimo	'Tapiotar, precise woman/wife'	Central Finland, Ladoga Karelia, North Karelia, North Savo, South Karelia, White Karelia
Tapiotar, vaimo kaunis	'Tapiotar, beautiful woman/wife'	North Karelia, White Karelia
Tapiolan vaimo kaunis	'Beautiful woman/wife of Tapiola'	North Karelia
Hongas, ehtoisa emäntä	'Hongas, generous mistress'	Central Finland
Hongas Pohjalan emäntä Hongas, Pohjolan emäntä Höngäs, Pohjolan emäntä	'Hongas, mistress of Pohjala' 'Hongas, mistress of Pohjola'	Ladoga Karelia, North Karelia, Ostrobothnia, South Savo; Note: Christfried Ganander called her a "lady of the northern forest".
Katajatar, kaunis vaimo	'Katajatar, beautiful woman/wife'	White Karelia
Katajatar, neiti kaunis	'Katajatar, beautiful miss'	North Karelia
Pihlajatar, piika pieni	'Pihlajatar, little maid'	North Karelia
Tuometar, tytär Tapion	'Tuometar, daughter of Tapio'	North Karelia, White Karelia
Tuometar, Tapion neiti	'Tuometar, miss of Tapio'	Kainuu, Lapland
Tuometar, tytär typerä	'Tuometar, foolish daughter'	White Karelia
Tuometar, hyvä emäntä	'Tuometar, good mistress'	North Savo
Tuometar, puhas emäntä	'Tuometar, pure mistress'	North Savo
Tuometar, Tapion tytti	'Tuometar, Tapio's girl'	White Karelia
(About Tuometar:) Päivälän miniä Päivölän miniä	'Daughter-in-law of Päivölä'	Kainuu
Luomatar, metän miniä	'Luomatar, daughter-in-law of the forest'	South Savo
Metän piika pikkuruinen	'Tiny maid of the forest'	North Karelia
Varvutar, hyvä valio	'Varvutar, good elite'	White Karelia
Romentolan valio vaimo	'Outstanding woman/wife of Romentola'	Unknown; Note: According to Ganander, Romentola means a "terrible forest".
Metän ehtosa emäntä	'Generous mistress of the forest'	Unknown
