= Hiiden hirvi =

Mythical moose from Finnish mythology

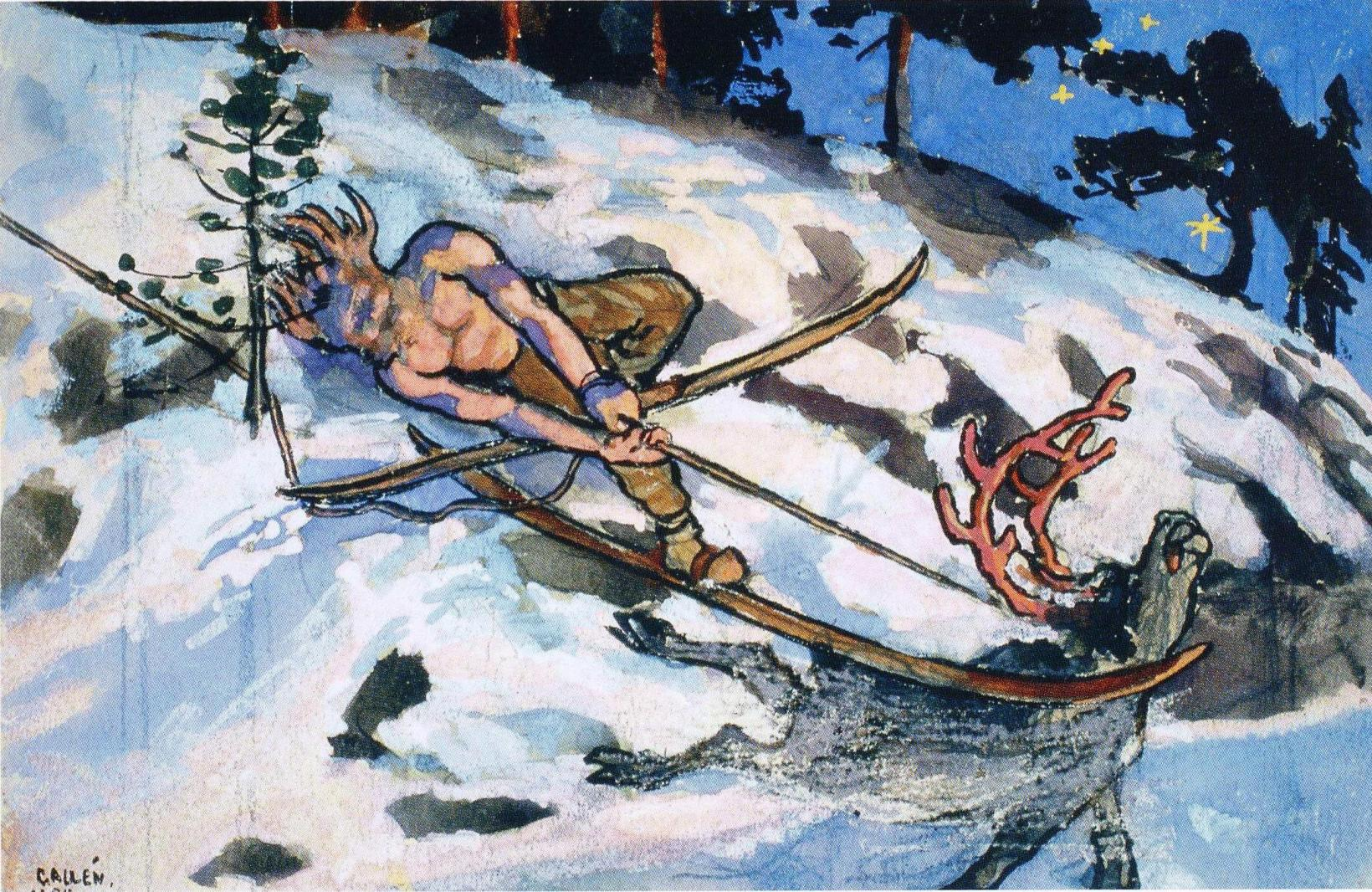
Akseli Gallen-Kallela: Hiiden hirven hiihto (1894).

Hiiden hirvi (lit. 'Hiisi's moose') is a mythical moose in Finnish mythology which must be hunted by skiing. This myth describes the creation of skis and the origin of the moose.

The Estonian equivalent of Hiiden hirvi is Hiiehobune (lit. 'Hiis's horse').

== Ski hunting of Hiiden hirvi ==
In White Karelian and Olonets Karelian versions of the myth, the protagonist is either Lystikki, Lysmetti or Lyylikki, the "smith of skis", or Lemminkäinen. The protagonist makes mismatching skis and starts their journey, the next part describing the origin of the moose. The protagonist arrives at a location where women laugh, children cry and dogs bark. They tell the protagonist this is because Hiiden hirvi just passed through the area and ruined the food. The protagonist starts their chase of the moose but one of the skis break and the moose escapes. However, in one version of the song, the protagonist successfully shoots down the moose on the third attempt.

In Ladoga Karelian versions, the protagonist is usually "Lappalainen" (a Sámi person). He might be given the name Lauri. In one version, the protagonist is Väinämöinen and in this case, he succeeds in hunting the moose.

In a North Karelian version, the protagonist is Laurinpoika lappalainen ('Sámi son of Lauri'), but the runic song ends with him hunting a squirrel on the third attempt instead. In Ingrian songs, Lauri Lappalainen makes skis and goes hunting, succeeding on the third attempt, but after this point the stories turn completely different.

A Kainuu version of the song begins with the origin of the moose and does not specify a protagonist, although Hiiden hirvi runs through a Sámi village, ruining the food and causing children to cry and dogs to bark. The hunter begins to chase the moose with skis, catching up to the animal on his third push.

North Savo poems mention Hiiden hirvi in middle of other songs, one of them also describing the moose running through and ruining the food. One North Savo poem and another North Ostrobothnian one say that Hiisi created mooses.

The oldest written version of the story is from the historical Ostrobothnia province and describes the origin of the moose (although the first half of it resembles the origin of the bear) and then states that a moose ran to the front of a Sámi goahti, and there was no one in Sápmi who didn't prepare themselves to catch it.

Due to the words kauppi and vuojolainen appearing in Karelian versions of the song, Kaarle Krohn assumed the protagonist was a merchant from Gotland. Komi people also have a myth of a hunter, Jirkap, who is able to hunt a deer with very fast skis. Sámi, Khanty and Mansi myths also tell of the ski hunting of a cosmic moose.
