= Nyyrikki =

Finnish god of the hunt and cattle

- Son of Tapio
- Other names: Karelia: Nyypetti, Vilpus, Virbusa, Virpus; Ostrobothia: Pinneus, Pinneys
- Gender: Male
- Ethnic group: Finns, Karelians

Genealogy
- Parents: Tapio (father); Mielikki (mother)

Nyyrikki (Finnish pronunciation: [ˈnyːrikːi]), Nyypetti, Vilpus or Pinneys is the Finnish god of the hunt and cattle, and son of Tapio and Mielikki. He has been tenuously associated with Nimrod.

Nyyrikki was first mentioned by Mikael Agricola in 1551 as Nyrckes, who gave squirrels from the forest. He is referred to with various different but similar sounding names in folk poetry, such as Nyypetti. Forms of the name like Nyyrikki and Nyypetti are called Tapio's son, but forms like Myyrikki are called Tapio's daughter, like Tyytikki, who is also mentioned in spells as a giver of squirrels. The -kki at the end of the name is itself a feminine suffix.

While the similar sounding names Myyrikki and Tyytikki refer to Tapio's daughter, and the names Nyrkiö and Nylkys to Tapio's wife, there exists a "son of Tapio" in both Karelian and Ostrobothnian runic songs: a North Karelian reindeer hunting song refers to "Nyypetti, son of Tapio"; a White Karelian spell to drive away rabbits mentions "Nyyrikki, Lord of Rabbits"; Ladoga Karelian reindeer hunting songs mention "Vilpus, son of Tapio"; and North Ostrobothnian bird hunting songs mention "Pinneys, son of Tapio". The words after Vilpus and Pinneys mentions are the same in songs, asking for him to give prey instead of holding onto them. Karelian runic songs tend to pair up Tapio's wife Nyrkiö/Nyrkytär/Nylkys/Nylky with Tapio's son Vilpus/Virpus.

The name "Vilpus" comes from Philip the Apostle, though Elias Lönnrot initially explained it as coming from the "lively (vilpas) nature" of the son of Tapio.
