= Käreitär =

Deity

- Mother of Foxes
- Other names: Kärehetär
- Animals: Fox
- Gender: Female
- Ethnic group: Finns, (Karelians?)

Käreitär or Kärehetär is a haltija or goddess in Finnish mythology, who appears in hunting spells.

First mentioned in writing in 1786 in a fox hunting spell, she was called the Mother of Foxes and a golden woman. In the spell, the hunter offers to her as a sacrifice gold and silver which the hunter's father had won from war. A Kainuu bear hunting spell written down in 1888 mentions the Golden Lady, Kärehetär. She is invited to come to melt and boil silver and gold, and like in the earlier fox spell, the hunter offers her gold and silver the hunter's father had won from war. Another Kainuu fox hunting spell does not address her by this name, but Nokeainen kullan muori ("sooty old mother of gold").

== Name ==
It has been theorized that the origin of her name is in the poetic line saying that Forest Mistress's hands are wrapped in gold (kädet kultakäärehissä). Kaarle Krohn suggested the name would come from kärki 'woodpecker', as wood which had holes made by woodpeckers was the best kind of wood to use for fox traps. Jacob Fellman wrote in 1839 that the Sámi in some regions, as well as Finns of Lapland, knew the Mother of Foxes, Käreitär. This is why Martti Haavio used the Sámi languages to explain her name: kierâ means the tip of a tail, also used to describe the hair at the tip of a fox's tail. In terms of sound law, the Finnish equivalent of kierâ would be *käre.

== Lukutar ==
A single, rare Ladoga Karelian runic song mentions Lukutar, who is offered gold and silver when hunting a black fox specifically. Krohn thought this name came from lukku ~ lukko "lock", while Juhana Canstrén wrote that the word also has the meaning "pitfall; cave". It could be a reference to foxes digging dens or foxes being hunted with pitfalls.

== Epithets ==
Epithet	Epithet meaning	Regions
Käreitär kultavaimo	'Käreitär, golden woman/wife'	Ostrobothnia
Kärehetär, kultaneiti	'Kärehetär, golden miss'	Kainuu
Lukutar, lukun emäntä	'Lukutar, mistress of pitfall/cave/lock'	Ladoga Karelia
