= Mielikki =

Finnish goddess of forests

- Mistress of the Forest
- Other names: Central Finland: Siilikki, Siivikki; Forest Finns: Annikka; Kainuu: Annikki, Menninki, Mielis-neiti, Mikikki, Mitikkä, Tapio; Karelia: Annikka, Annikki, Annukk', Himmerkki, Huijutar, Kuitar, Kuiter, Kuitio, Kuuriitar, Lemmitär, Malitar, Mesitär, Metikki, Metsätär, Meččätär, Meziter, Mielikko, Mielotar, Mieluneito, Mieluutar, Mierotar, Miiriitar, Mikitär, Mimerkki, Nylgysä, Nylkys, Nyrkiö, Nyrkkiö, Nyrkytär, Simanter, Tapio, Tapiotar, Tarkotin; Lapland: Annikka; Ostrobothnia: Annukka, Höytöri, Mieli, Mielis-neiti, Mieluneiti, Mielus, Tapiotar, Tinatti; Savo: Annikka, Himmerkki, Hyyperö, Hyypiö, Metikki, Mielu, Mielus, Mielutar, Muurutar, Tapio, Tapiotar, Tuuvikki, Varvutar; Tavastia: Tapio
- Gender: Female
- Ethnic group: Finns, Karelians
- Offspring: Tellervo; Tuulikki; Nyyrikki

Equivalents
- Estonian: Metsaema
- Livonian: Mõtsa-jema
- Erzyan: Viŕ-ava

Mielikki (Finnish pronunciation: [ˈmie̯likːi]) is the Finnish goddess of forests and the hunt. She is usually called Metsän emäntä (lit. 'Mistress of the Forest'), though the epithet Metsän miniä (lit. 'Daughter-in-law of the Forest') also exists. As the mistress, she is seen as the wife of Tapio and the mother of Tuulikki, Tellervo and Nyyrikki.

She was more important and prayed to more often than her husband Tapio. "Tapio" also appears as a name of Mielikki, and the feminized form "Tapiotar" appears as a name of Mielikki as well as Tuometar and Hongatar, both sometimes called Tapio's daughter.

== Name ==
Her name is thought to have come from mieltyä 'to grow fond', as it was hoped she would grow fond of the hunter and give plenty of prey. According to Kaarle Krohn, the variant Lemmitär comes from lempeä 'gentle', while the variants Simanter, Metikki and Kuitar are all connected to the nectar (mesi) of the forest, mead. Kuitar would come from the word kuu 'fat'. The names Siivikki and Siilikki come from siipi 'wing', and Tarkotin from tarkka 'precise'.

Krohn also theorized that he variants such as Himmerkki and Mimerkki would come from Swedish himmelrik 'kingdom of heaven', and Mikitär and Mitikkä from Saint Nicetas the Goth. He also thought most variants beginning with K and H to come from Saint Hubert of Liège, though pointing out that hyypiö also means an eagle owl. According to Samuli Paulaharju, the Siberian jay was called the mistress of the forest in Kuhmo, for it was known to be "the oldest bird".

Names such as Nylgysä, Nylkys, Nyrkiö, Nyrkkiö and Nyrkytär are used for Tapio's wife in Karelia. It has been connected to nylkeä 'to skin'. In 1551, Mikael Agricola wrote that Nyrckes brought squirrels from the forest. It sounds similar to Tuulikki/Myyrikki/Tyytikki, who is called Tapio's daughter and the mother of squirrels. Karelian runic songs further mention Nyyrikki as a son of Tapio, despite the feminine form of the name. Kaarle Krohn thought it came from Jyrki (Saint George), Uno Harva thought it could be an old forgotten name for the squirrel, while Martti Haavio connected the name to Saint Bartholomew who was skinned and crucified.

The Mistress of the Forest is sometimes called Annikki. This name was influenced by Saint Anne.

== In tradition ==
In 1789, Christfried Ganander mentioned her as Tapiotar, the great mother of feathers (suuri sulkain emuu), and mentions Tapio as a name of the forest goddess as well. As tapio is synonymous with 'forest', the name Tapio has been seen as a personified forest, as king of the forest Tapio if male and as the forest mistress if female.

In runic songs, she is described as having had a role in the creation of the bear: she brought up the bear under a spruce. She is, along with her daughters, also asked to dull a bear's claws so it wouldn't hurt cattle. Hunting spells in runic songs feminize and eroticize the forest, asking the forest and its mistress to grow fond of the hunter and become wet for him (mielly metsä, kostu korpi). Mielikki was especially prayed to when hunting rabbits and birds, called emon vilja (lit. 'mother's grain').

She is sometimes described with the colour blue, such as having a blue cape or socks. In Central Finland, the mother or daughter-in-law of the forest is also said to have wings, even blue wings, as she appears as a ruler of wasps. In a Ladoga Karelian song, she as Kuitar is asked to bake a fatty (kuini) and nectariferous cake. In another song, this was misinterpreted as Kuutar baking.

Mielikki displays one of the features of a metsänhaltija ('forest haltija'), as forest haltijas could appear at hunters' camping sites: if she was dressed beautifully in gold, it meant the forest mistress was going to be generous with plenty of prey. If she was ugly, with arm-wrappings, rings and headwear made of twigs, she would not give much prey.

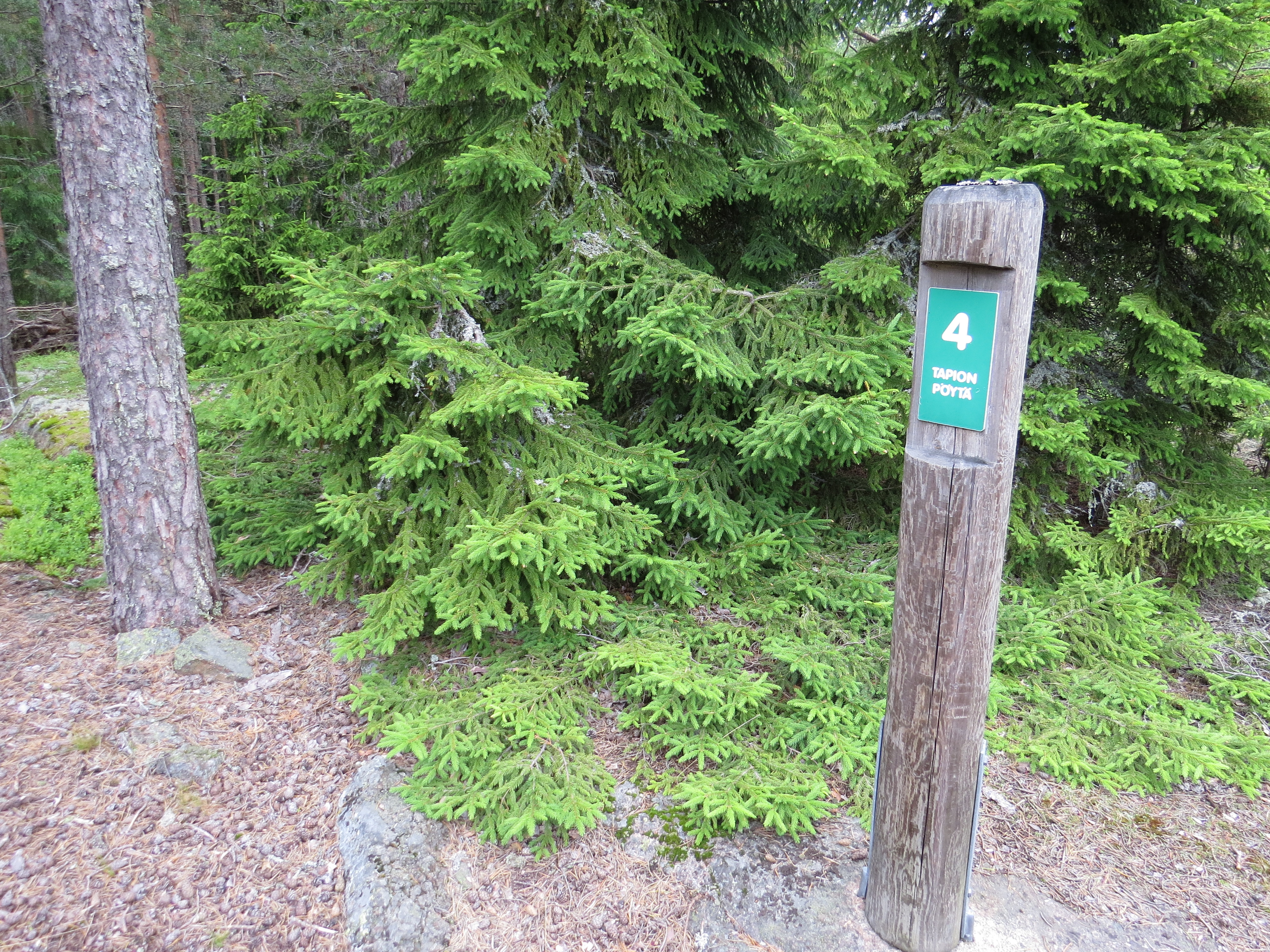
Tapionpöytä ('Tapio's table').

The Forest Finns knew Mehänemäntä 'Mistress of the Forest' as a haltija or a goddess who lived beneath a spruce. She was sacrificed to at a spruce growing without the treetop (called metsänemännän tupa lit. 'cottage of the Mistress of the Forest' by Forest Finns and Tapionpöytä lit. 'Tapio's table' in Finland). The Finns of Northern Sweden used the term metsänemäntä (lit. 'Mistress of the Forest') to refer to the skogsrå.

Mielikki is known as a skillful healer who heals the paws of animals who have escaped traps, helps chicks that have fallen from their nests and treats the wounds of wood grouse after their mating displays. She knows well the healing herbs and will also help humans if they know well enough to ask her for it.

== In the Kalevala ==
In the Kalevala, the Finnish national epic based on Finnish and Karelian folklore, the hero Lemminkäinen offers her and Tapio prayers, gold and silver so he can catch the Hiisi elk. In another passage, Mielikki is asked to protect cattle grazing in the forest.

== Epithets ==
Epithet	Epithet meaning	Regions
Metsän emäntä	'Mistress of the Forest'	Central Finland, Kainuu, Karelian Isthmus, Ladoga Karelia, Lapland, North Karelia, North Ostrobothnia, North Savo, White Karelia
Mielus, Mehtolan emäntä	'Mielus, Mistress of Mehtola'	Ostrobothnia, South Savo
Kuuriitar, mehän kunninkas	'Kuuriitar, king of the forest'	North Karelia
Mielikki kivien emäntä	'Mielikki, mistress of rocks'	White Karelia
Mielikki metsän tytti	'Mielikki, girl of the forest'	White Karelia
Mielikki, metän emut	'Mielikki, mother of forest'	White Karelia
Mielikki metän eläjä	'Mielikki, one who lives in the forest'	White Karelia
Mielikki metän miniä	'Mielikki, daughter-in-law of the forest'	North Karelia, White Karelia
Mielikki, metosen tyttö	'Mielikki, girl of little forest'	White Karelia
Mielikki, metsän kultanen	'Mielikki, the golden one of the forest'	White Karelia
Mielikki, metinen emäntä	'Mielikki, nectariferous mistress'	North Karelia
Mielikki korea neito	'Mielikki beautiful maiden'	Uusimaa
Tapiolan tarkka vaimo Tapiolan tarkka akka Tarkka Tapion vaimo	'Precise wife of Tapiola' 'Precise wife of Tapio'	Central Finland, Kainuu, Karelian Isthmus, Ostrobothnia, South Savo, White Karelia
Tapiolan vanha vaimo	'Old wife of Tapiola'	North Ostrobothnia
Tapion vaimo Akka Tapion	'Tapio's wife'	Kainuu, Karelian Isthmus, North Savo
Tapiolan tarkka neito	'Precise maiden of Tapiola'	Ostrobothnia, South Savo
Tarkka Tapion tytti	'Precise girl of Tapio'	White Karelia
Annikki, Tapion eukko	'Annikki, Tapio's wife'	Olonets Karelia
Annikki, ahon emäntä	'Annikki, mistress of an abandoned swidden'	South Savo
Musta sukka, suon emäntä	'Black sock, mistress of a swamp'	South Savo
Salakaaren vaimo kaunis Salokorven vaimo kaunis Satakaaren kaunis vaimo	'Beautiful woman/wife of the secret arch' 'Beautiful woman/wife of deep forest wilderness' 'Beautiful woman/wife of a hundred archs'	White Karelia
Metsän ehtosa emäntä	'Generous mistress of the forest'	North Karelia, Ostrobothnia
Metsän mieli Mikikki	'Mind of the forest Mikikki'	Kainuu
Metän kulta Mielis-neiti	'Gold of the forest, Miss Mielis'	Kainuu
Metsän kukka kultarinta	'Gold-chested forest flower'	White Karelia
Metsän tyttö tylleröinen	'Little girlie girl of the forest'	White Karelia
Korven kultanen omena	'Golden apple of the wilderness'	Ladoga Karelia
Metsän muori muotokaunis	'Beautiful-formed old mother of the forest'	Kainuu
Metän piika pikkuruinen	'Tiny maid of the forest'	Kainuu, North Karelia
Vanhin vaimoloista	'Oldest of women'	White Karelia
Eläjistä ensimmäini	'First of the living'	White Karelia
Pesömättä puhtukaini	'Clean without washing'	White Karelia
Pohjan tytti, käyrä neiti	'Girl of the north, crooked miss'	White Karelia

== In contemporary culture ==
The Mielikki Mons, a mountain on Venus, is named after her.
