= Ilmarinen =

God from Finnish mythology

- Eternal Hammerer; God of the sky, air and weather
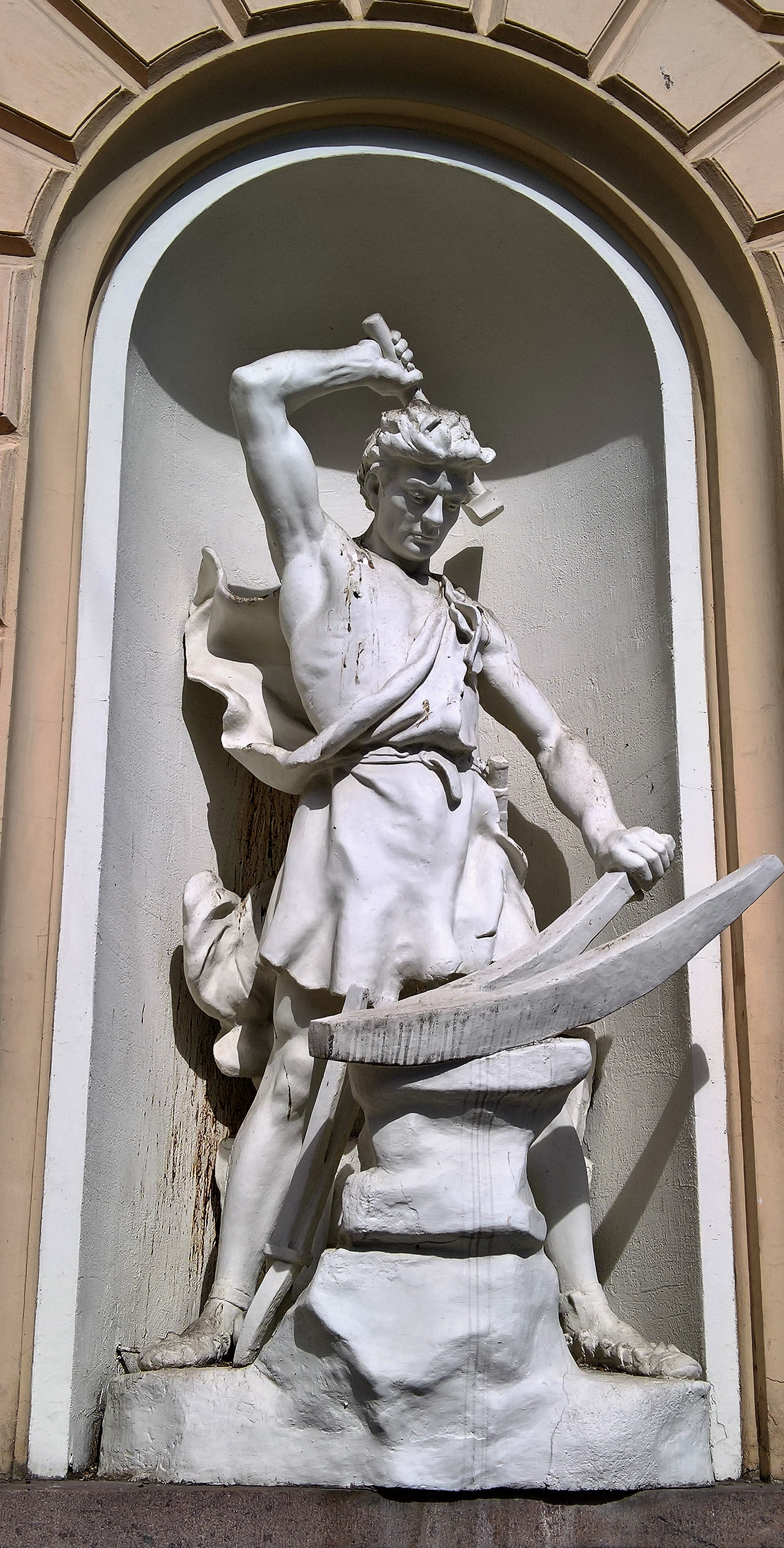
- Statue of Ilmarinen at the Old Student House, Helsinki by Robert Stigell, 1888
- Other names: Central Finland: Ilimarinen, Ilmari, Ilman rinta Ingria: Ilmari, Ilman rinta, Ilmarinta, Ismaro, Ismaroinen; Kainuu: Ilimari, Ilimarinen, Ilmari, Ilman rinta, Ilmarunen, Ilmola, Ilmorini, Imnarinen, Kopsu? Karelia: Ilimari, Ilimarinen, Ilmari, Ilman rinta, Ilman ukko, Ilmarinta, Ilmola, Ilmollinen, Ilmollini, Ilmorinen, Ilmorini; Lapland: Ilmari, Ilman rinta, Ilmarinta; Ostrobothnia: Ilmalainen, Ilmari, Ilman rinta, Ilmola; Savonia: Ilimari, Ilimarinen, Ilmari, Ilman ukko, Ilmarinta; Torne Valley: Ilmari; Uusimaa: Illamoinen
- Symbol: Bellows

Equivalents
- Sámi: Biegga-galles
- Udmurt: Inmar
- Komi: Jen

Ilmarinen (pronounced [ˈilmɑrinen]) is a god and archetypal artificer from Finnish mythology. He is immortal and capable of creating practically anything. In addition, he is described as working the known metals of the time, including brass, copper, iron, gold, and silver. The great works of Ilmarinen include the crafting of the dome of the sky and the forging of the Sampo.

Ilmarinen is the successor of the original sky god from West Uralic mythology, as well as the personification of the sky. In runic songs, many of his roles were later shifted to the new sky god Ukko, but both became less important than the new Odin-resembling hero Väinämöinen. While Ukko gained the role of a controller of rain and weather for the purposes of agriculture, Ilmarinen continued to be regarded as a wind god.

In the Kalevala, he is a blacksmith and an inventor. His usual epithet in the Kalevala is seppä or seppo ("smith"), which is the source of the given name Seppo.

== Etymology and origin ==
Cognates of the Finnish word ilma ('air') are attested in almost all the main Finno-Ugric languages apart from the Mari and Mordvinic languages, allowing the reconstruction of proto-Finno-Ugric *ilma meaning something like 'sky'. This noun is also attested as the name of a god in Khanty (Num-Iləm), Komi (Jen), Udmurt (Inmar) and the Finnic languages, suggesting that Proto-Finno-Ugric likewise had a sky god credited with creating the sky called *Ilma. In Proto-Finnic, the suffix -r(i), which is used to form words for people associated with the root word, was added to *ilma to give the god-name *Ilmar(i) ('Sky-being'); rare attestations of similar forms such as Udmurt Ilmar and Sámi Ilmaris seem to be loans from Finnic. The name could've also existed among Sámi as a thunder god Ilmaričče. In the Kalevala metre poetry, the diminutive suffix -nen enabled the formation of the name Ilmarinen, which neatly fills two trochaic feet and so became the dominant form of the name in that tradition.

According to Eugene Helimski and Vladimir Napolskikh, Proto-Uralic religion had a concept of a creator sky god who did not effect things much after the creation of the world, only providing stability and continuity somewhere in the background, almost like a deus otiosus. He was usually not approached directly, and it was more common that deities of nature and the underworld were asked to help instead. As the forger of the sky, Ilmarinen fits as a successor of this Proto-Uralic sky god. He is believed to have taken on the qualities of a smith through the Proto-Finnic contact with iron-working cultures, such as the Indo-European Balts (Note: (Kuusi, Bosley & Branch 1977) : rune 8 (Seppä, The Smith) explicitly refers to Ilmollini as jumala (god). in Siikala 2002, 171) or speakers of Common Germanic.

Ilmarinen is also directly appealed to for aid in several incantation runes. Insofar as Elias Lönnrot heavily redacted the original runes collected by him and others, it's valuable to differentiate between the Kalevala and the original poems sung by rune singers.

The first time Ilmarinen was mentioned in writing was by Mikael Agricola in 1551, who called Ilmarinen as the one who "brought peace and air, and took travellers forward" (Ilmarinen Rauhan ja ilman tei / ja Matkamiehet edheswei.). In 1663, Johan Cajanus wrote that in folk belief, Ilmarinen was one of the 12 sons of the giant Kaleva. Despite Agricola's description, Ilmarinen rarely has the role as a helper of sailors in runic songs; only one such runic song has been recorded (from North Ostrobothnia and Kainuu) but its structure has raised doubts about if it was truly initially formed as oral tradition among the common folk. According to Kaarle Krohn, being a helper of sailors seems more like something loaned from the Norse Njörðr.

In 1728, a man named Påhl Hindrikinpoika Paskoja was accused of witchcraft in court in Pyhäjärvi. He had to sing runic incantations during the trial, including the origin of fire, where Ilmarinen and Väinämöinen struck fire by forging. He explained that Ilmarinen was a god people used to worship, while Väinämöinen was something which lived in a mountain.

In his 1789 book Mythologia Fennica, Christfried Ganander described Jumala like Ilmarinen is typically described: as the forger of the dome of the sky. He wrote that even in pagan times, ancient Finns had a concept of a creator of everything. He also described Ilmarinen as Väinämöinen's younger brother and a god over air and weather who also had control over fire and water. He equated Ilmarinen with Aeolus. As a forger creator god, Martti Haavio compared Ilmarinen to Norse Odin as himnasmiðr (lit. 'sky smith'), Hindu Tvashtr, Chinese Pangu, and Abkhaz Szasz.

Other names for Ilmarinen that are found in rune variants include Ilmorinen, Ilmollini, Ilmalainen, Ilman rinta, Ilman ukko, and Ismaroinen. Asko Parpola has attempted to connect the name to the Hindu god Indra. The word jumala (lit. 'god') has been theorized to be loaned from Proto-Indo-Iranian *dyumā́n ('celestial'), which is Indra's epithet in the Vedas.

== In runic songs ==
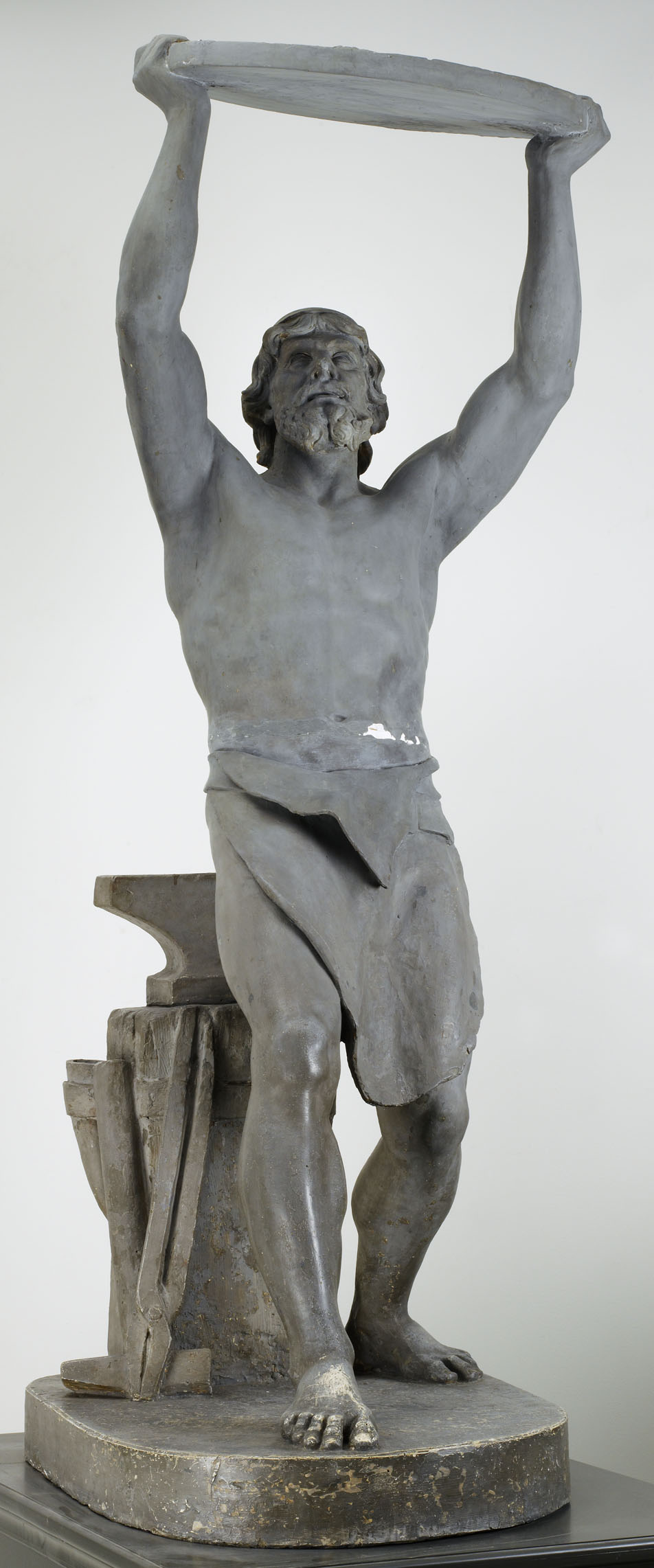
"Ilmarinen Forging the Moon" by Walter Runeberg (1866).

Runic songs mention Ilmarinen as the one who forged the dome of the sky in a door-less and window-less forge. This idea was born during the Iron Age, which in Finland spanned from c. 500 BCE to 1300 CE. Ilmarinen is also involved with two other Baltic Finnic creation myths: In Ingrian runic songs, he forged an iron rake for a swallow so it can gather the pieces of its eggs which end up becoming the Sun, the Moon, and the clouds. In the Kullasta saari (lit. 'island from gold') creation myth from South Savo, the island at the center of the world is born when a drop of boiling gold falls from Ilmarinen's pot to the middle of the sea.

In the runic songs of the origin of fire, a spark of fire is struck by Ilmarinen with three kokko eagle feathers. Pekka Hakamies equated the one striking fire to the lord of the thunderstorm. Uno Harva thought that while Ilmarinen is the primary figure of this position, it alone is not sufficient to categorize him as a true thunder god. On the other hand, Frog wrote that that the sky god and thunder god likely used to be the same: Ilmari. Ilmarinen is also the first to forge iron. Iron swore to Ilmarinen that it was not going to hurt anyone, but broke this promise when a hornet brought snake poison into iron's quenching water.

Ilmarinen is often the forger of the Golden Maiden: he spends days forging with his servants, creating a sword and a stallion. He is not satisfied with this and begins to work the bellows himself, which results in the creation of a golden maiden, finally making him happy. However, a maiden made of gold is cold to lie next to, so the song ends with a lesson: men should never make a maiden of gold and silver, for she will be cold. The role of the forger is sometimes given to different characters, such as Väinämöinen in Kiuruvesi, or Lemming, Kuller, Kalev, or an unnamed brother of the singer in Estonia. An Estonian song from Muhu also calls the forger a "world wise smith" (seppa ilmatarka), which could mean Ilmarinen.

He is also described as forging items for humans and gods, such as weapons and women's everyday objects. Though Cajanus and Ganander called Ilmarinen a son of Kaleva, this title is never given to him in runic songs.

== Epithets ==
Epithet	Epithet meaning	Regions
Seppo Ilmarinen; Seppä Ilmarinen	'Ilmarinen the Smith'	Ingria, Kainuu, Karelian Isthmus, Ladoga Karelia, North Karelia, North Ostrobothnia, North Savo, Olonets Karelia, South Karelia, South Savo, White Karelia
Takoja iänikuinen	'Eternal hammerer'	Ingria, Karelian Isthmus, Ladoga Karelia, North Karelia, North Savo, Olonets Karelia, South Savo, White Karelia
Kovan rauan kolkuttaja	'Knocker of hard iron'	North Karelia
Takoja taputtelija	'Forger, patter'	Ladoga Karelia, Olonets Karelia
Palavan rauan patskuttaja	'Banger of burning iron'	Ladoga Karelia
Kaiken maailman takoja	'Forger of the whole world'	Ostrobothnia
Ilman kannen kalkuttaja	'Clatterer of the dome of the sky'	Ostrobothnia, White Karelia
Taivaan (taitava) takoja	'(Skillful) forger of the sky'	Central Finland, Kainuu, White Karelia
Suuri Ukko Ilmarinen	'Great Lord Ilmarinen'	Ladoga Karelia
Päällä pilvehin Jumala	'God on clouds'	North Karelia
Tarkka entinen takoja	'Precise former forger'	Ingria

== In the Kalevala ==
=== The Forging of the Sampo ===
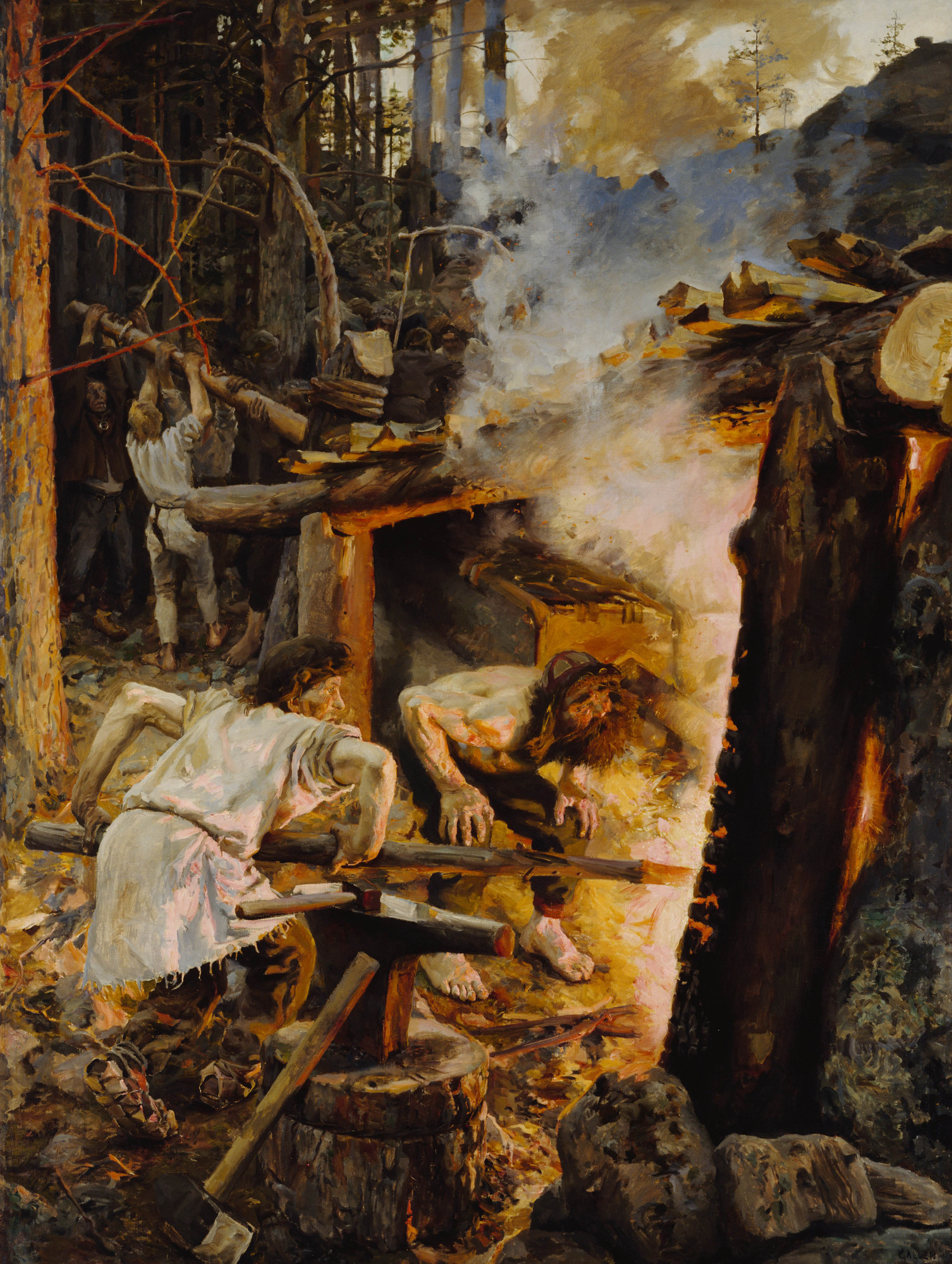
The Forging of the Sampo by Akseli Gallen-Kallela, 1893

Summary based on Lönnrot 1999, 105-119 [canto 10]

When the old sage, Väinämöinen, was traveling wide in the search of a wife, he was captured by the old mistress of Pohjola, the land of the North. In return for giving him safe passage from the land of Pohjola back to his native country, the enchantress Louhi of Pohjola wanted to have made the Sampo, a magic artifact. Väinämöinen replied that he could not make her one, but that Ilmarinen could, and promised to send the great smith to Pohjola to do just that. In return for this wondrous device, Louhi would also give Ilmarinen her daughter's hand in marriage.

On having returned home, Väinämöinen tries to awe Ilmarinen with tales of the maiden's beauty and so lure him to Pohjola. Ilmarinen sees through the ruse, however, and refuses. Not to be outdone, Väinämöinen tricks the smith into climbing a fir tree trying to bring down moonlight that is glimmering on the branches. Conjuring a storm-wind with his magical song, Väinämöinen then blows Ilmarinen away to Pohjola.

Once there, Ilmarinen is approached by the toothless hag, Louhi, and her daughter, the Maiden of Pohjola, and having seen the maiden's beauty, consents to build a Sampo. For three days, he sought a place to build a great forge. In that forge he placed metals and started working, tending the magic fire with help of the slaves of Pohjola.

On the first day, Ilmarinen looked down into the flames and saw that the metal had taken the form of a crossbow with a golden arch, a copper shaft and quarrel-tips of silver. But the bow had an evil spirit, asking for a new victim each day, and so Ilmarinen broke it and cast the pieces back into the fire.

On the second day, there came a metal ship from the fire, with ribs of gold and copper oars. Though beautiful to behold, it too was evil at heart, being too eager to rush towards battle, and so, Ilmarinen broke the magic boat apart and cast back the pieces once more.

On the third day, a metal cow emerged, with golden horns and the sun and the stars on its brow. But alas, it was ill-tempered, and so the magical heifer was broken into pieces and melted down.

On the fourth day, a golden plow is pulled from the forge, with a golden plowshare, a copper beam and silver handles. But it too is flawed, plowing up planted fields and furrowing meadows. In despair, Ilmarinen destroys his creation once more.

Angered at his lack of success, Ilmarinen conjures the four winds to fan the flames. The winds blow for three days, until finally, the Sampo is born, taking the shape of a magic mill that produces grain, salt and gold. Pleased with his creation at last, Ilmarinen presents it to Louhi, who promptly locks it in a vault deep underground.

Returning triumphant to the Maiden of Pohjola, Ilmarinen bids her to become his wife. To his dismay, she refuses to leave her native land, forcing him to return home alone and dejected.

Variants of the original runes used by Lönnrot in compiling the Kalevala present a different picture of Ilmarinen. In one variant of The Sampo (Kuusi, Bosley & Branch 1977, rune 12) for example, Ilmarinen goes willingly to Pohjola to forge the Sampo, not because he was tricked by Väinämöinen, but in order to redeem Väinämöinen from death. In addition, the same rune portrays Ilmarinen as returning home successfully with the Maiden of the North.

Ilmarinen's portrayal as "unlucky in love" in the Kalevala is primarily due to Lönnrot's own choices while revising and compiling the original runes to form a cohesive narrative. (Note: Lönnrot's revisions and even rewriting of runes is discussed at length in (Pentikäinen 1999, ch. 2).) In another example from an original rune entitled Kosinta (The Courtship), (Kuusi, Bosley & Branch 1977, rune 17) Ilmarinen takes a journey to compete for Hiisi's daughter. He again succeeds in obtaining his wife after completing the tasks of ploughing a field of vipers, bringing Tuoni's bear, and bringing the pike of Tuoni.

=== Ilmarinen's bride of gold ===
Summary based on Lönnrot 1999, 497-504 [canto 37]

After the loss of his first wife to Kullervo's curse, the disheartened Ilmarinen attempts to craft a new one from gold and silver, but finds the golden wife hard and cold. Dismayed, he attempts to wed her to his brother Väinämöinen instead, but the old sage rejects her, saying that the golden wife ought to be cast back into the furnace and tells Ilmarinen to "forge from her a thousand trinkets". Speaking to all of his people, he further adds:

"Never, youths, however wretched,
Nor in future, upgrown heroes,
Whether you have large possessions,
Or are poor in your possessions,
In the course of all your lifetime,
While the golden moon is shining,
May you woo a golden woman,
Or distress yourselves for silver,
For the gleam of gold is freezing,
Only frost is breathed by silver."

The tale of the Golden Wife can be seen as a cautionary tale based on the theme of "money cannot buy happiness". To a contemporary reader, there is also a similarity to the hubristic nature of the Golem legend, or to Frankenstein, in that even the most skilled of mortals cannot rival divine perfection when creating life.

In another example of Lönnrot's editorial license, the Kullervo cycle originally existed as an independent series of runes. In his effort to create a homogeneous narrative, Lönnrot presented Kullervo as Ilmarinen's slave in order to insert Kullervo into the Sampo cycle of runes. However, some scholars are convinced that the Golden Bride was originally an independent rune that was eventually added to the Sampo cycle. Furthermore, independent variants of the Kultamorsian (Golden Bride) rune have been collected. In Matti Kuusi's opinion, the warning reproduced above is a secondary element that was probably added during the Christian period. Rather than serving as a cautionary tale, the original runes probably expressed the widespread myth of a Golden Woman found throughout Arctic Eurasia.

== In popular culture ==
- A portrayal of Ilmarinen and depiction of selected tales from the Kalevala can be found in the 1959 movie Sampo (film).
- Finnish metal band Amorphis released their ninth album in 2009 called Skyforger, which is a concept album based around the stories and legends of Ilmarinen.
- The band Turisas recorded a song called "Cursed Be Iron" about the aforementioned smith, and he is mentioned in "Rauta" by Korpiklaani. Korpiklaani also released a song called "Kultanainen" about the creation of Ilmarinen's golden wife.
- In the trilogy The Winter of the World by Michael Scott Rohan, Ilmarinen is the godlike Power revered by the duergar, who say he forged the mountains in which they live. Another Power, the Odin-like Raven, speaks of Ilmarinen, "greatest of the Elder Powers," having taught him.
- Ilmarinen appears in Joseph Michael Linsner's comic Dawn: Return of the Goddess when the title character seeks him out to forge a sword for her.
- Ilmarinen appears as Ilmari Heikkinen the Wonder-smith in Mercedes Lackey's 500 Kingdoms Series' homage to Sámi (among other Scandinavian and northern European) myths and legends, The Snow Queen (2008).
- Ilmarinen (spelled "Il-marinen") is referenced in the 1931 short story "The Children of the Night" by Robert E. Howard. The narrator refers to him as "...the god I called upon, the ancient, ancient god who worked in metals—in bronze then. For Il-marinen was one of the base gods of the Aryans from whom many gods grew; and he was Wieland and Vulcan in the ages of iron. But to Aryara he was Il-marinen..."

== Gallery ==
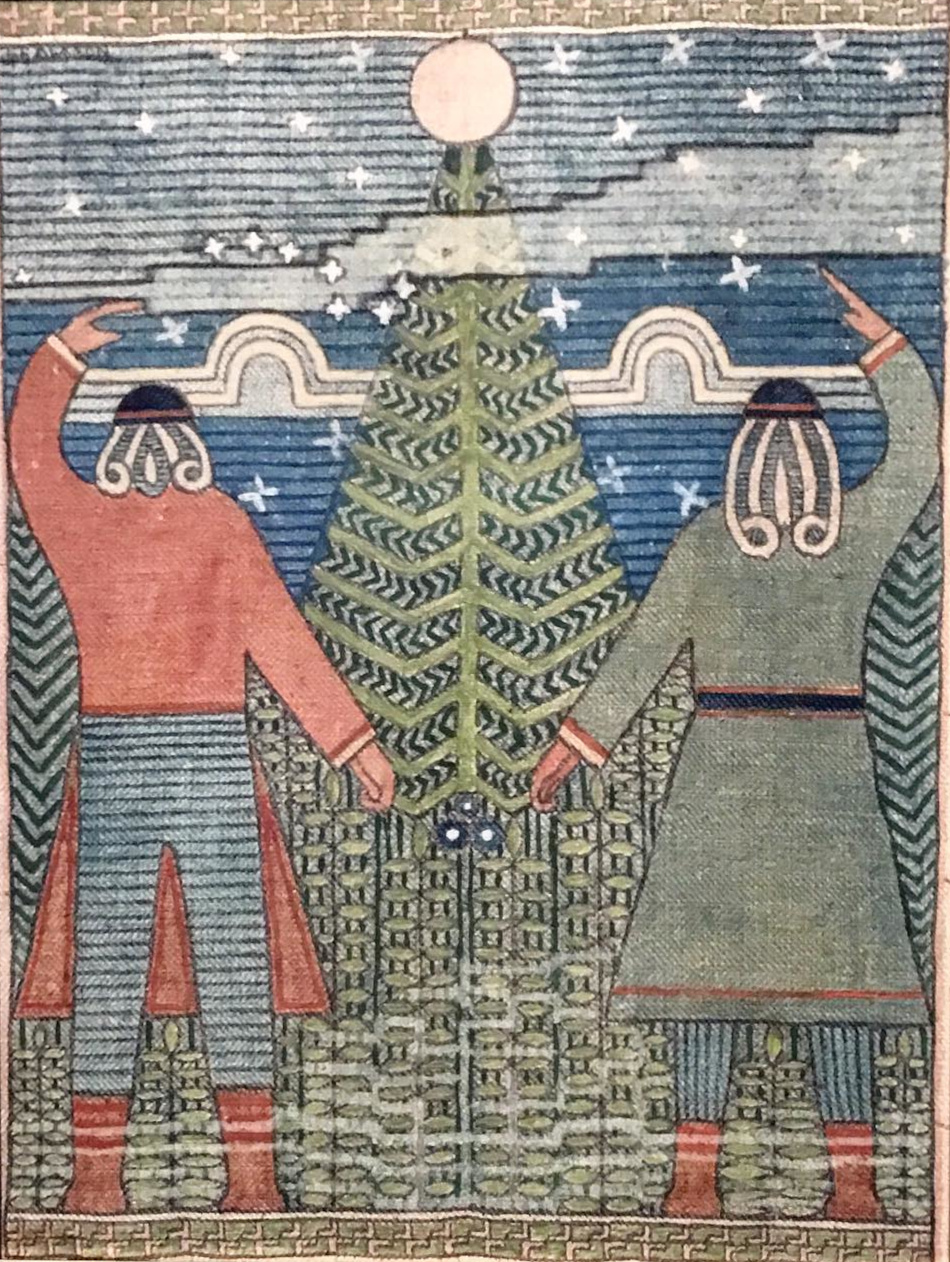
Moonwatchers, Joseph Alanen, 1908–1910

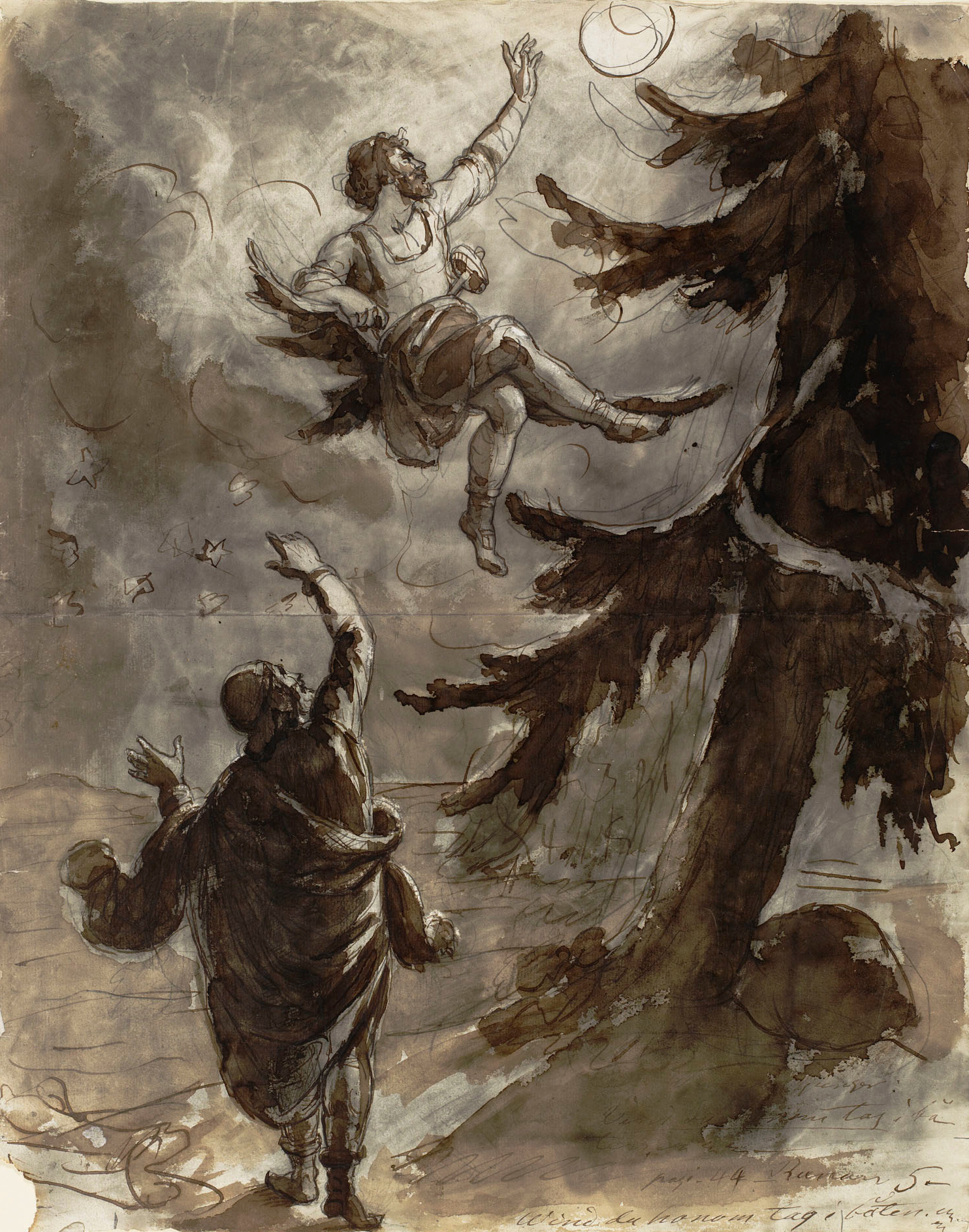
Väinämöinen and Ilmarinen by the Giant Spruce, Robert Wilhelm Ekman

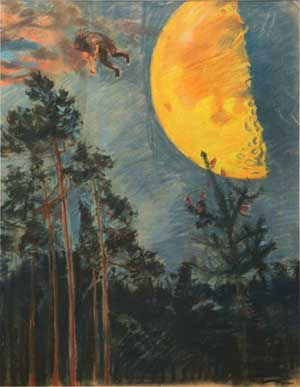
Ilmarinen Flies Over the Moon, Akseli Gallen-Kallela, 1892

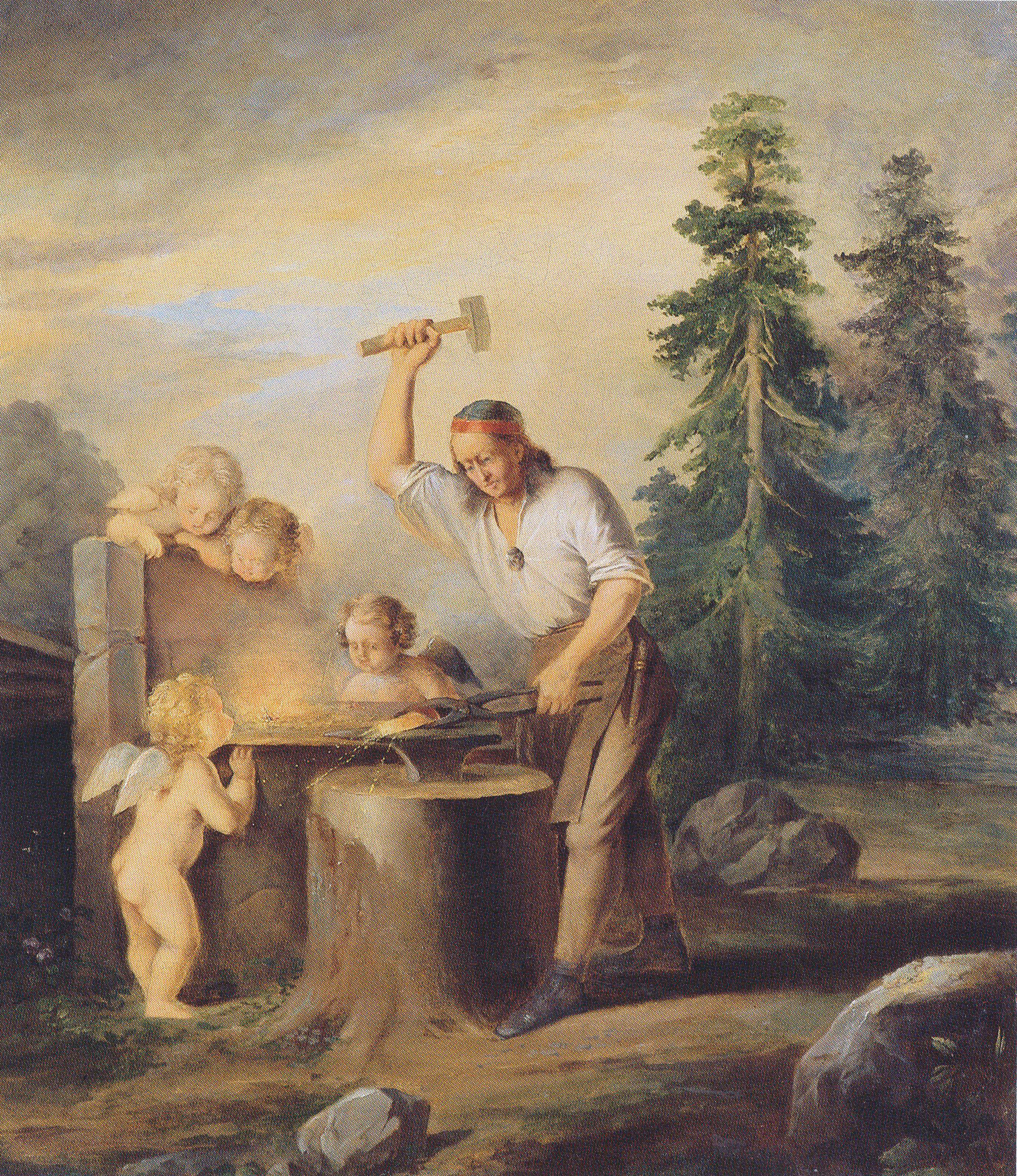
Ilmarinen Forges the Sampo, Berndt Godenhjelm, 19th century

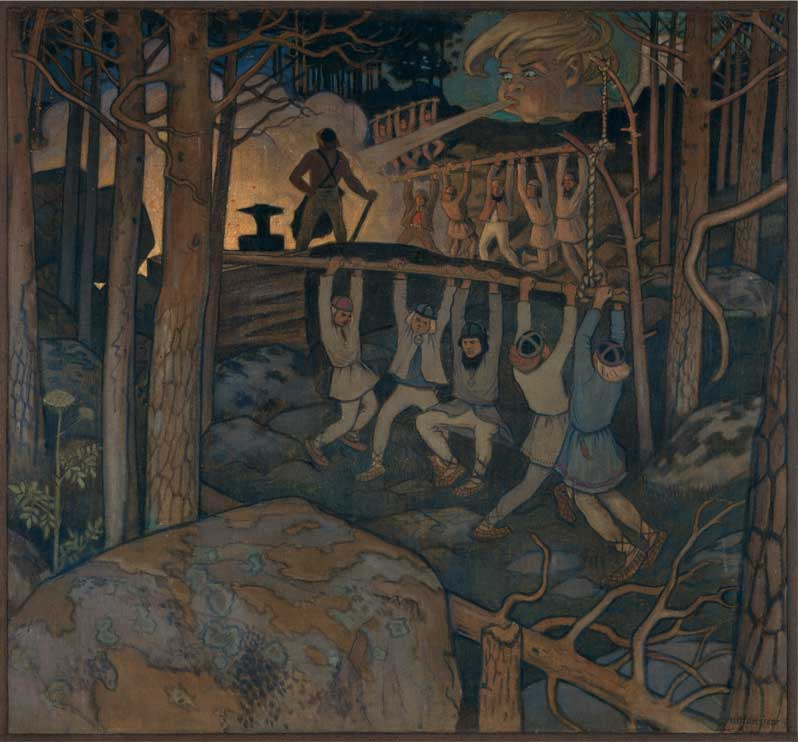
The Forging of the Sampo by Väinö Blomstedt, 1897

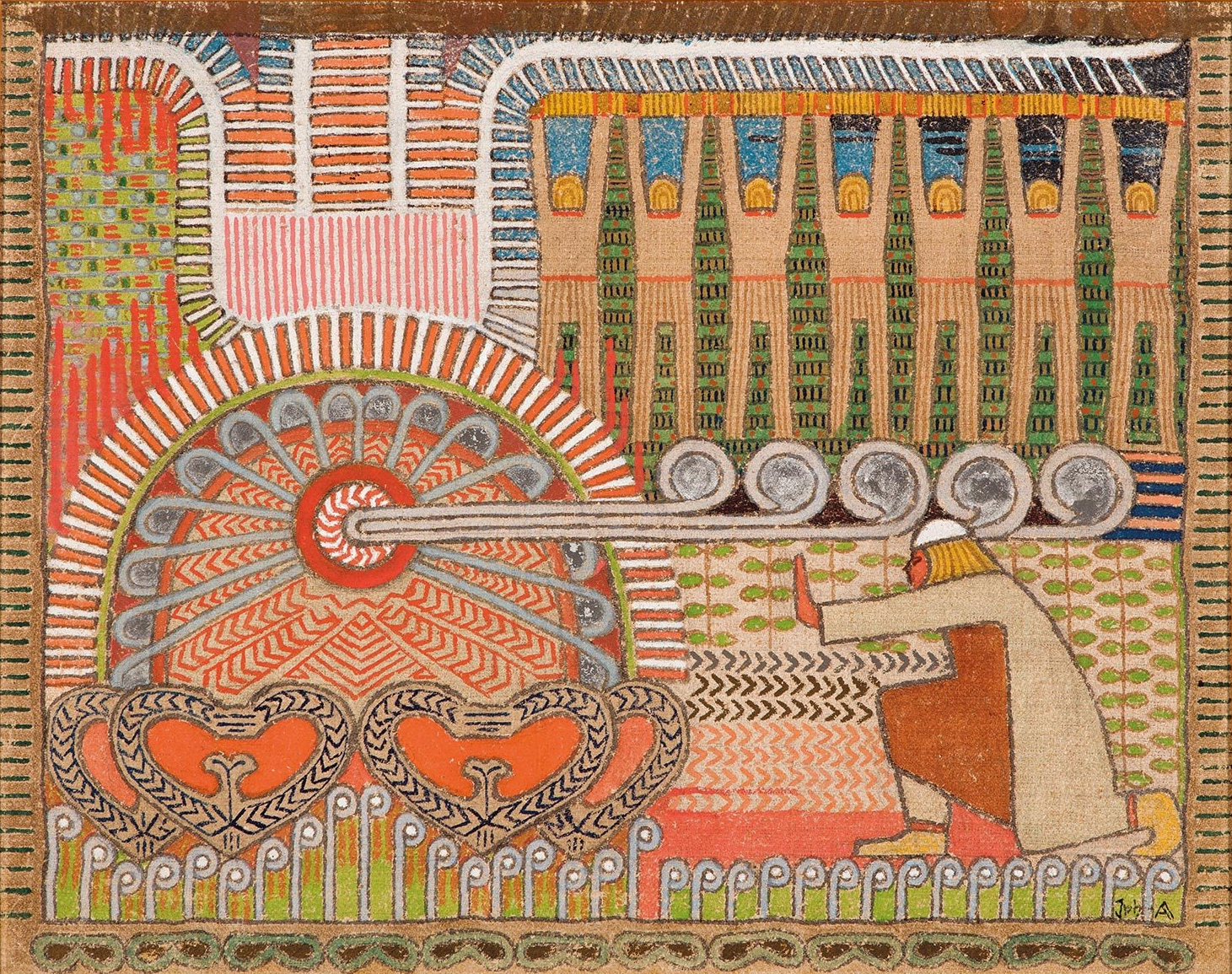
The Forging of the Sampo, tempera by Joseph Alanen, 1910–1911

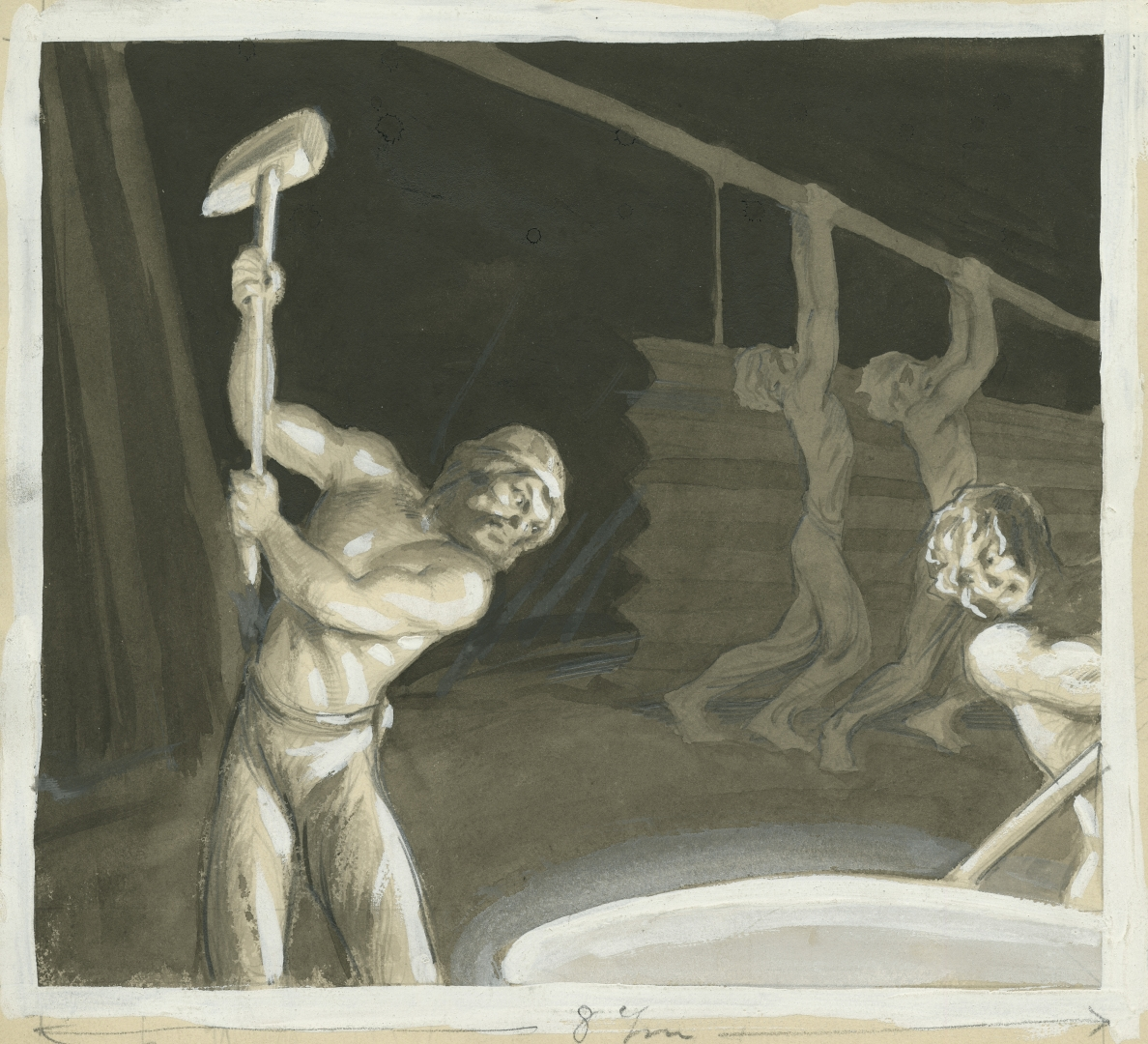
Illustration of the Sampo being forged, by Rudolf Koivu in 1931

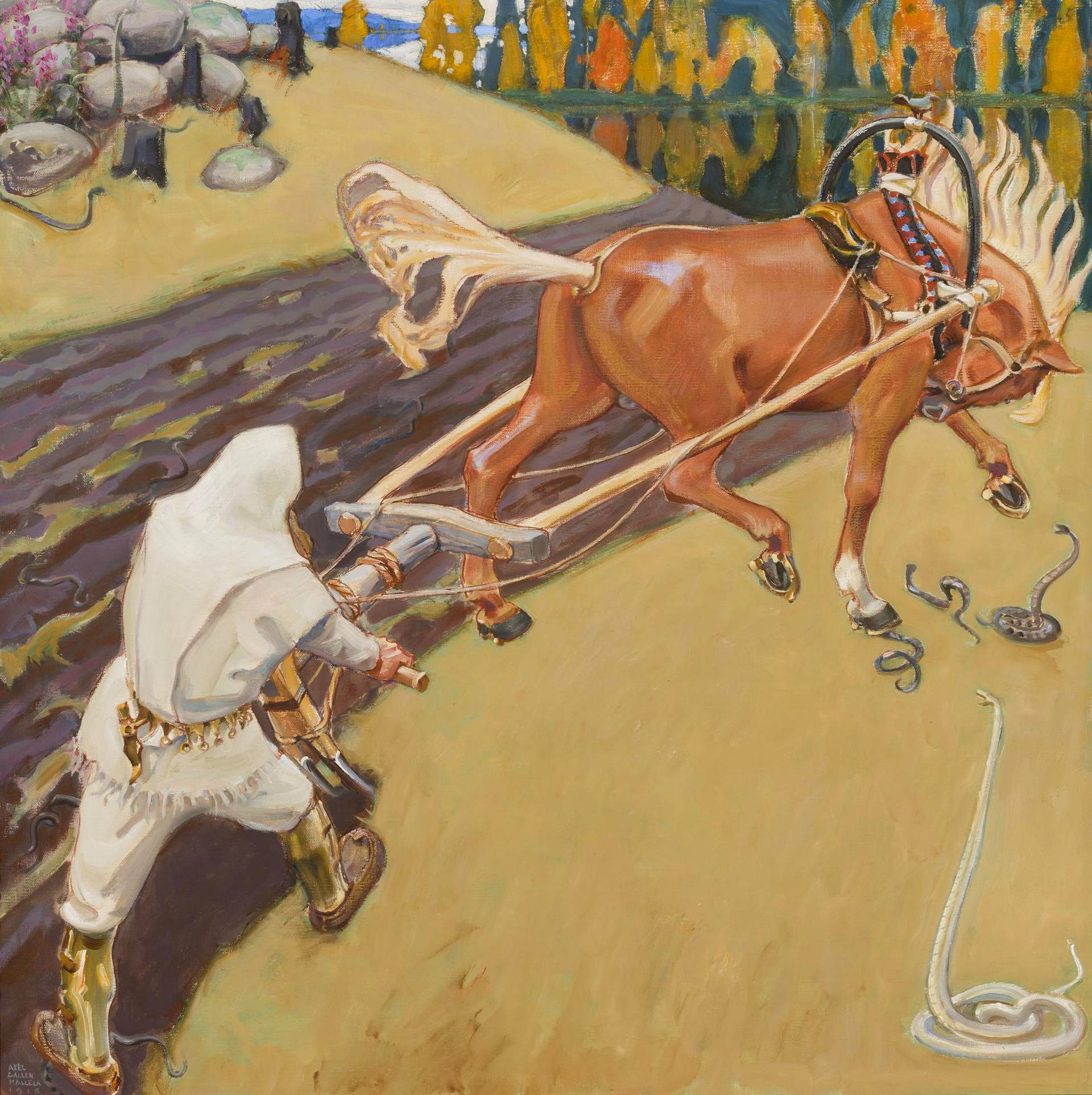
Ilmarinen Ploughs a Field of Vipers, Akseli Gallen-Kallela, 1916 (fi)

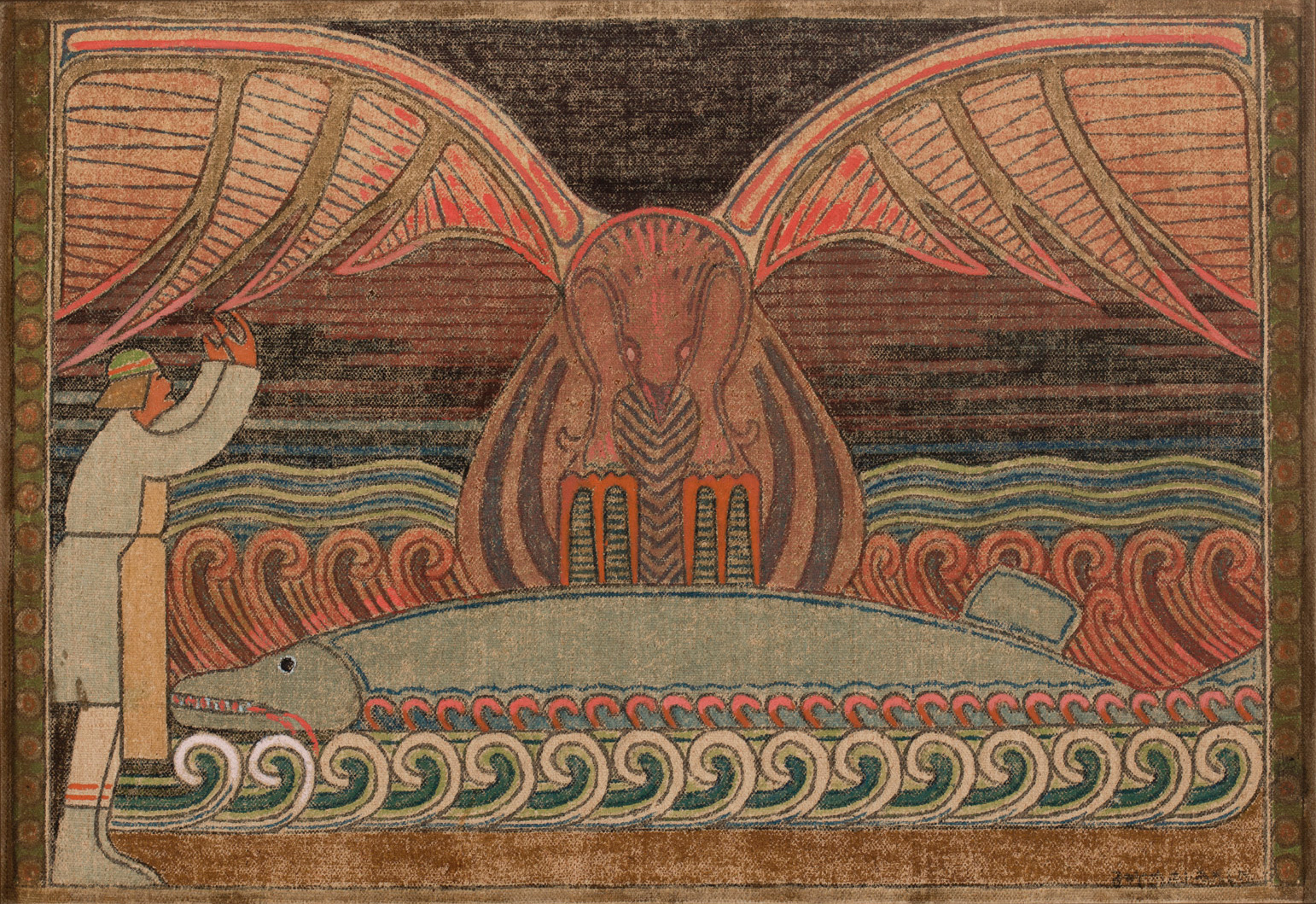
The Eagle and the Pike, Joseph Alanen

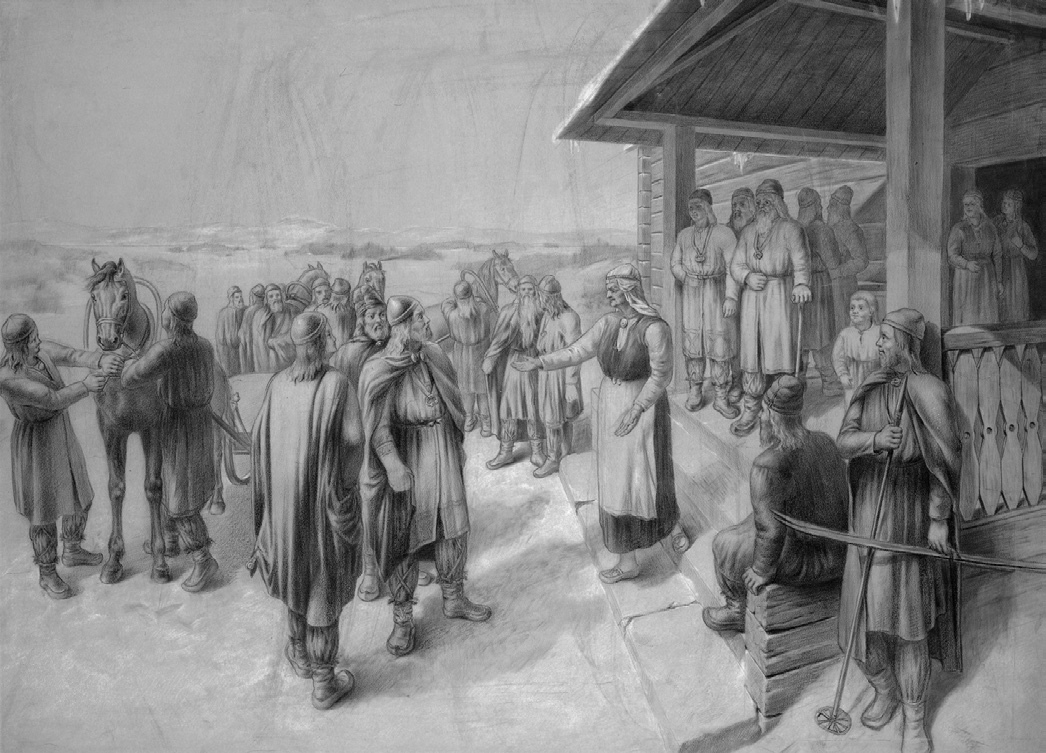
Ilmarinen Arrives as the Groom at Pohjola, charcoal work by Johan Kortman, 1893

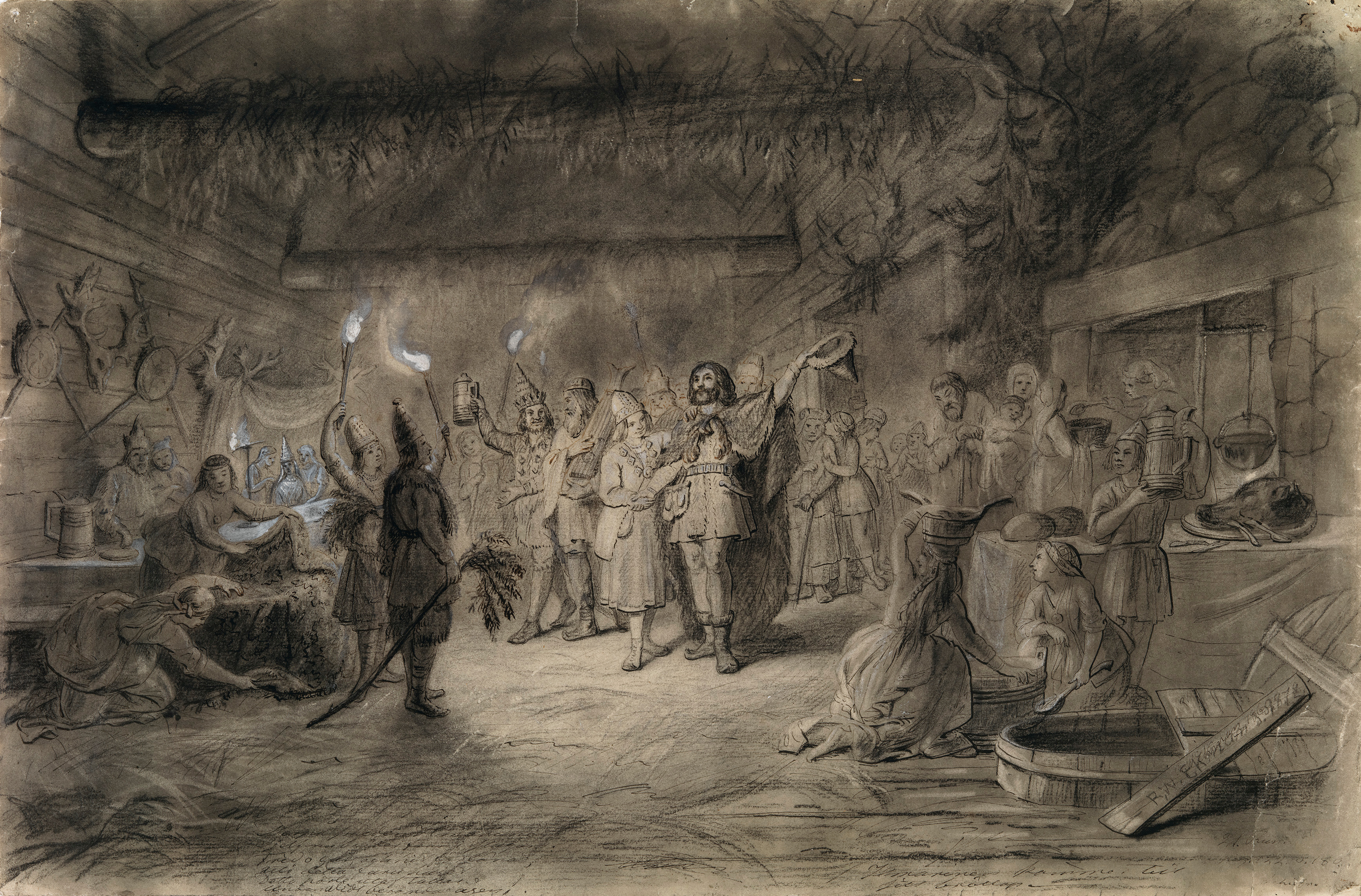
The Wedding at Pohjola, Robert Wilhelm Ekman, 1860–1872

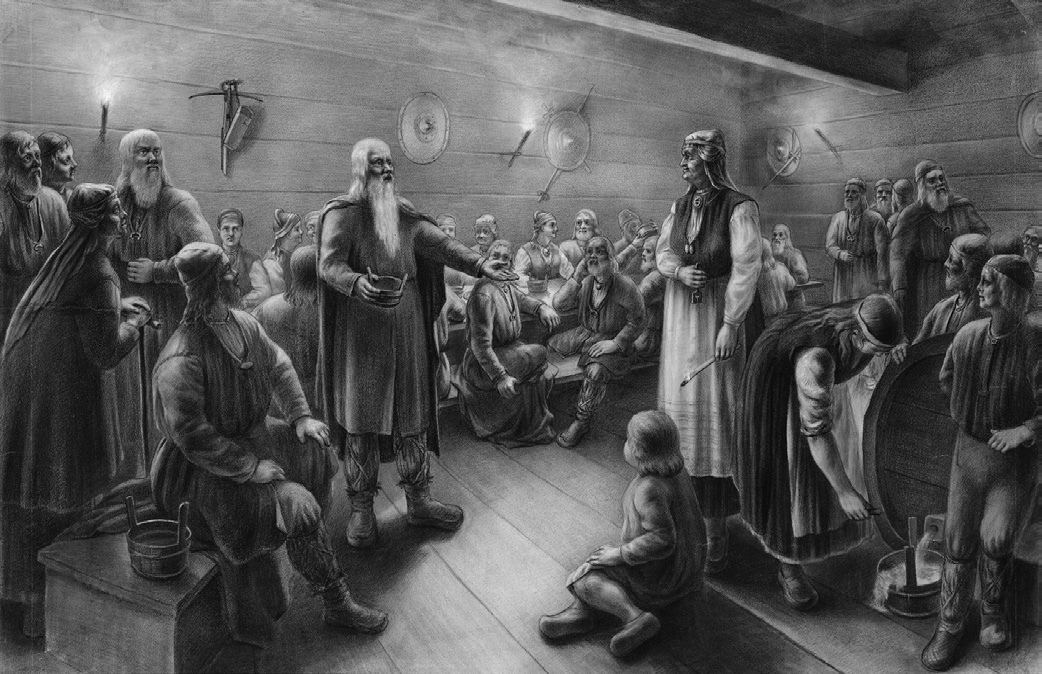
Pohjolan häät, Johan Kortman, 1890

== See also ==
- Dwarf (mythology), in Germanic myth dwarfs commonly fit the "artificer" archetype
