= Tapio (spirit) =

King of the Forest in Finnish mythology

- King of the Forest
- Other names: Central Finland: Hippa; Ingria: Hiippa, Hilli; Kainuu: Hilli, Kuittola, Kulkia, Rauhio; Karelia: Ahohippa, Havuhippa, Havuhippo, Hiia, Hiippa, Hiisi, Hilli, Hippa, Hippi, Hippo, Huitua, Hulli, Kuituva, Tabia, Tapia, Viippo; Lapland: Hilli, Kulkia; Ostrobothnia: Havuhippa, Hilli, Hilppa, Hippa, Hippo, Hukka, Huuhkana, Iivana, Kuikuli, Kuippana, Kuittia, Kuitua, Kulkia; Satakunta: Hiisi, Hipa, Hippi, Tapiainen; Savonia: Hiippa, Hilja, Hilli, Hippa, Hippahattu, Hippo, Huippa, Kuihkamo, Kuihkanen, Kuippana, Kuituri, Kulkia, Vippo; Tavastia: Hippa; Uusimaa: Hyppä
- Abode: Forest
- Tree: Picea abies f. tabulaeformis
- Gender: Male
- Ethnic group: Finns, Karelians

Genealogy
- Spouse: Mielikki
- Offspring: Tellervo; Tuulikki; Nyyrikki

Tapio (Finnish pronunciation: [ˈtɑpio]), Kuippana or Hippa is a Finnish forest spirit or god in Finnish mythology. He is called the King of the Forest (Metsän kuningas). Hunters prayed to him before a hunt. His wife is the goddess of the forest, Mielikki. He is the father of Tellervo, Tuulikki and Nyyrikki (Pinneus). Fitting the Green Man archetype, Tapio has a beard of lichen and eyebrows of moss.

In runic songs, the name Tapio often refers to the feminine ruler of the forest, Mielikki (as well as the feminized version of the name, Tapiotar), or appears as a synonym for the word metsä 'forest'.

Many of Tapio's epithets, including "King of the Forest" and "grey-beard", are also used in runic songs to refer to the bear.

== Name ==
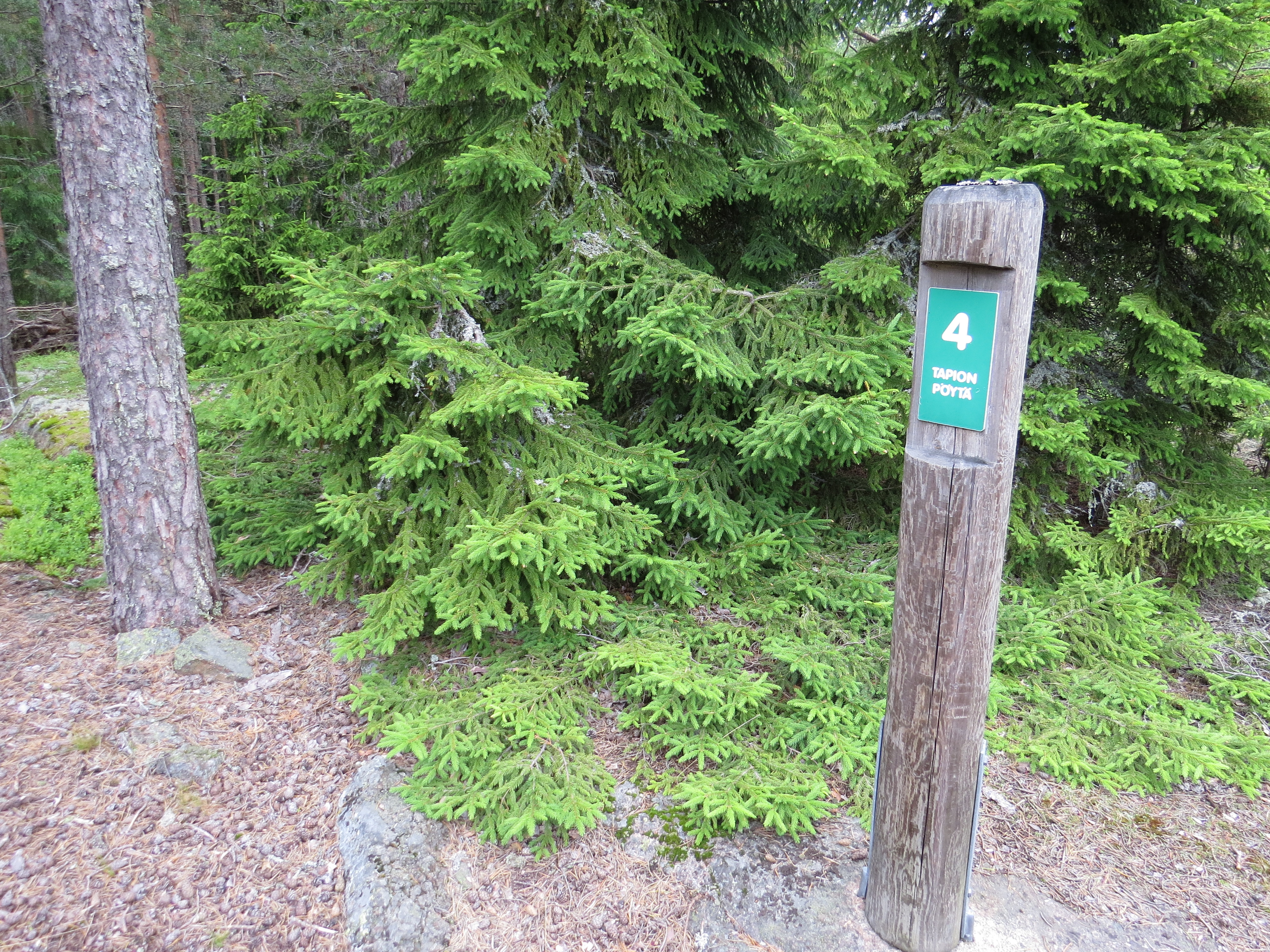
Tapionpöytä ('Tapio's table'), a spruce growing without the treetop, a place to bring offerings to Tapio.

The first to present a theory of Tapio's name was Nils Idman in 1774, as he suggested an origin in an epithet of Ares, Dafoinós 'brown, hairy'. In 1853, Franz Anton Schiefner suggested the name to be shortened from the Russian name of Saint Eustace, Jefstafij or Astafij. In 1891, Domenico Comparetti connected the name to the word tapi 'rod, staff' because he was, according to Comparetti, "likely worshipped in the shape of a tree trunk". In 1904, Otto Alcenius stated Tapio to be the same as Saint Stephen (Finnish: Tapani).

Kaarle Krohn and Uno Harva considered the equivalent of Tapio to be the Kola Sámi god of hunting and fishing, Tavaj. Martti Haavio suggested the name to come from tapa 'chance, luck', making the meaning of Tapio 'the one who gives (hunting) luck'.

According to Eemil Aukusti Tunkelo in 1914, the Baltic Finnic word tapa 'lock of a hunting trap' could be the origin of the name Tapio. However, the name Tapio is seen to be Western Finnish, and Western Finnish dialects have not been recorded to include the word tapa for a lock of a hunting trap. This is why Janne Saarikivi theorized the name would come from the word tavata (dialectical meaning 'to reach; to catch up to').

Hippa means a pointed cap, which could have been a symbol of a forest haltija, and it is the name of the chaser in the game tag, much like a hunter would chase after prey. Krohn's theory suggests the name Kuippana would be connected to the Roman Catholic saint Hubert, patron saint of hunters. Carl Axel Gottlund connected the name Kuippana to kuippa 'Eurasian curlew', while Gustaf Renvall connected it to the word kuikkana 'long-necked'. Other versions of Kuippana include Kuihtanen, Kuituri and Huitua. According to another theory, the name would come from vuitti 'lot, fate'. Krohn also compared Kuihkamo and Kuihkanen to kuihkata 'to call in the forest like a shepherd', while Huuhkana is close to huuhkaja 'eagle owl'. Kulkia he connected to kulkija 'traveller', likely influenced by the following verse's käyjä 'walker'. Krohn and Harva connected the "Kuiktilassi", who "gave rabbits" according to Johan David Alopaeus, to Kuippana. Haavio further connected Kuiktilassi to the word vuitti as well, assuming Kuikti meant 'share of meat, lot, fate' and Lassi came from Russian lásyi 'gourmet, sweet tooth, greedy, eager'.

A rare name Rauhio appears in Kainuu. Krohn brought forth a theory that this name was connected to the name Rafael (archangel Raphael). Krohn also points out a name for him from North Ostrobothnia where he is called Iivana, after the Russian name for John the Baptist.

== Descriptions ==
Mikael Agricola mentions Tapio as a Tavastian god who "brings traps from the forest" in the prologue to his Finnish translation of the Book of Psalms, Dauidin Psalttari. The Karelian equivalent, he says is Hiisi, who "brought victory over beasts". In Georgius Gabrielis Kijhl's 1688 thesis Corpus Angelicum, seu de corporibus angelorum assumpiitiis disputatio, it is said that Tapio is known as Hiisi in Karelia and Savonia. Both tapio and hiisi have been used as a synonym for 'forest'.

In 1789, Christfried Ganander listed Hippa or Kuippana as the highest forest god who drives animals into traps. Tapio he specifically mentioned as a forest haltija in the context of bear and rabbit hunting, explaining that Tapio was honored with the epithet Ukko 'old man'. He also called Tapio the god of hunting and animal husbandry, and that a rooster was sacrificed to him.

Gottlund and Krohn saw Tapio as a personification of the forest, Krohn stating that he was formed after the original meaning of the word was forgotten. Harva pointed out that the meaning of the word was sometimes unclear to runic singers, but other times it was used clearly in the meaning of 'forest'. He saw both Tapio and Hiisi as euphemisms, as people used, for example, the word metsä 'forest' as a name of the bear to avoid saying its real name out loud. Later descriptions portray Tapio as more human like, similar to maahiset (small human-like creatures that live underground). The forest was sometimes personified as male, like Tapio, but sometimes as female as the forest mistress. Haavio disagreed with the idea that Tapio would've originally meant 'forest', seeing all hunting deities (incl. Tapio, Mielikki and Tuulikki) as the one and the same 'distributor of lots'.

Worship of Tapio was done at a Tapionpöytä ('Tapio's table'), a spruce growing without the treetop (Picea abies f. tabulaeformis), to which a special beer was prepared and brought to. The worshipper would set all hunting weapons and traps to the root of the tree, walk around it while wearing a hat (twice clockwise and once counterclockwise), set the hat to the ground, kneel, lie down on his stomach, and squeeze the ground with his arm, as well as sing a runic song, a prayer to Tapio. Later descriptions are not so elaborate, describing that before the prayer, special beer is made from the soup made of the first catch, and small rye cakes (Tapion kakkarat) are also made and offered to the spruce. Silver and strong alcohol was also sacrificed.

Tapionpöytä also had other names, such as Tapion kanto ('Tapio's trunk'), Tapion tuoli ('Tapio's chair'), and Tapion mänty and Nyryn näre ('Tapio's pine' and 'Nyry's pine', when using a pine as an altar). Not only hunters, but cattlemen and women also sacrificed at the Tapionpöytä. In Viitasaari, the blood of the ram butchered on Michaelmas was brought to the top of Tapionpöytä; in Pihtipudas, the afterbirth of a mare was brought. In Kainuu, the first portion of cheese made from the milk of a newly calved cow was sacrificed, as well as the first portion of roast veal.

== Epithets ==
Epithet	Epithet meaning	Regions
Metsän kuningas	'King of the Forest'	Kainuu, Ostrobothnia, North Karelia, North Savo
Metsän kultainen kuningas	'Golden King of the Forest'	South Savo
Metsän Hippa, halliparta	'Hippa of the Forest, grey-beard'	Ostrobothnia, South Savo
Metsän ukko, halliparta	'Old man of the forest, grey-beard'	South Savo
Metsän isäntä	'Master of the Forest'	Kainuu, North Karelia, North Ostrobothnia
Kuuluisa metsän kuningas	'Known king of the forest'	Kainuu, Ladoga Karelia
Metsähine halliparta	'Forest-y grey-beard'	South Savo
Hilliukko, halliparta	'Old man Hilli, grey-beard'	Kainuu, Lapland, North Ostrobothnia
Havuhattu, naavaparta	'Needle hat, beard lichen'	North Karelia, South Savo
Ukko vanha röhmäparta		Ladoga Karelia
Havuhattu, halliparta		Ladoga Karelia

== Gallery ==
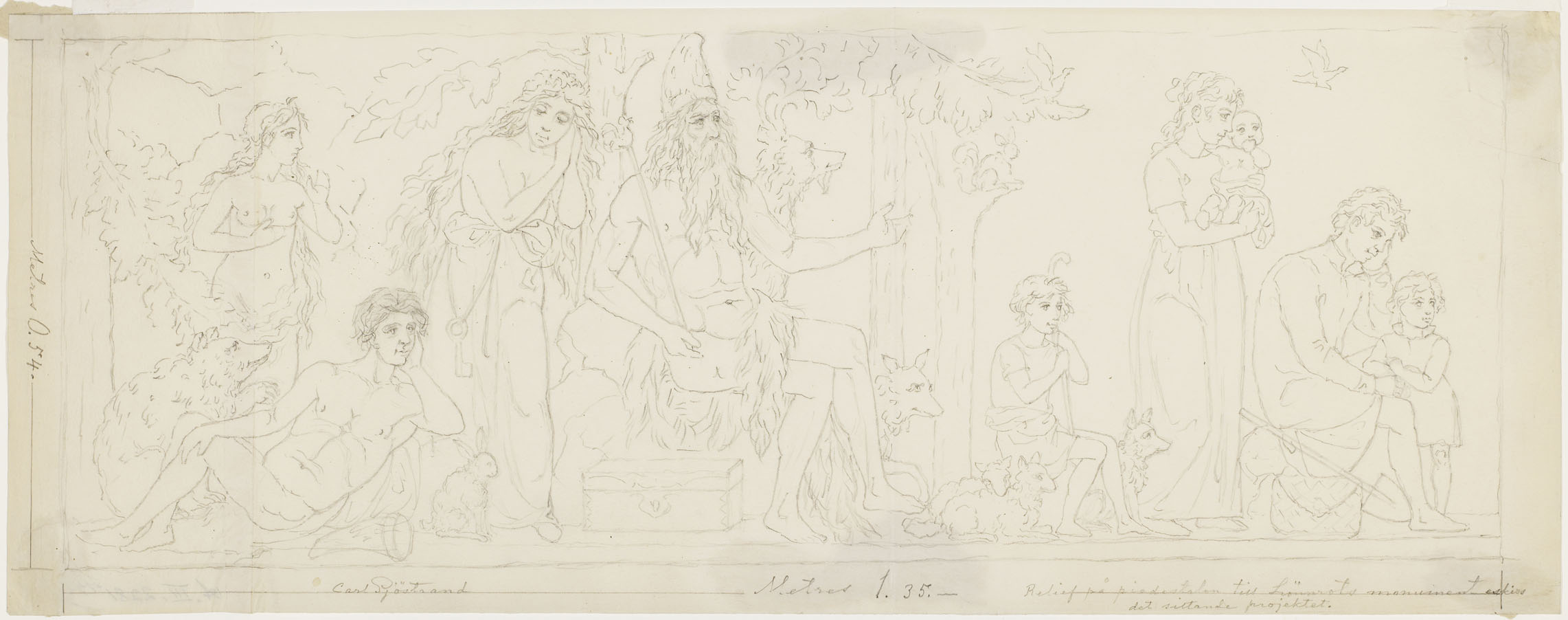
"Tapio with his folk", by Carl Eneas Sjöstrand (1898)

== In contemporary culture ==
He lends his name, in the form of Tapiola, to:

- one of the major urban centres within the city of Espoo outside Helsinki; and
- an unincorporated community in the US state of Michigan.

He has appeared various times in songs by Finnish metal bands. For example, in the symphonic metal band Nightwish's song, "Elvenpath", he is referred to as "Tapio, Bear-king, Ruler of the forest". The name has also been used extensively by the folk metal band Korpiklaani'.

Jean Sibelius' tone poem Tapiola (1926) is a depiction of the forest Tapio inhabits.
