= Finnish mythology =

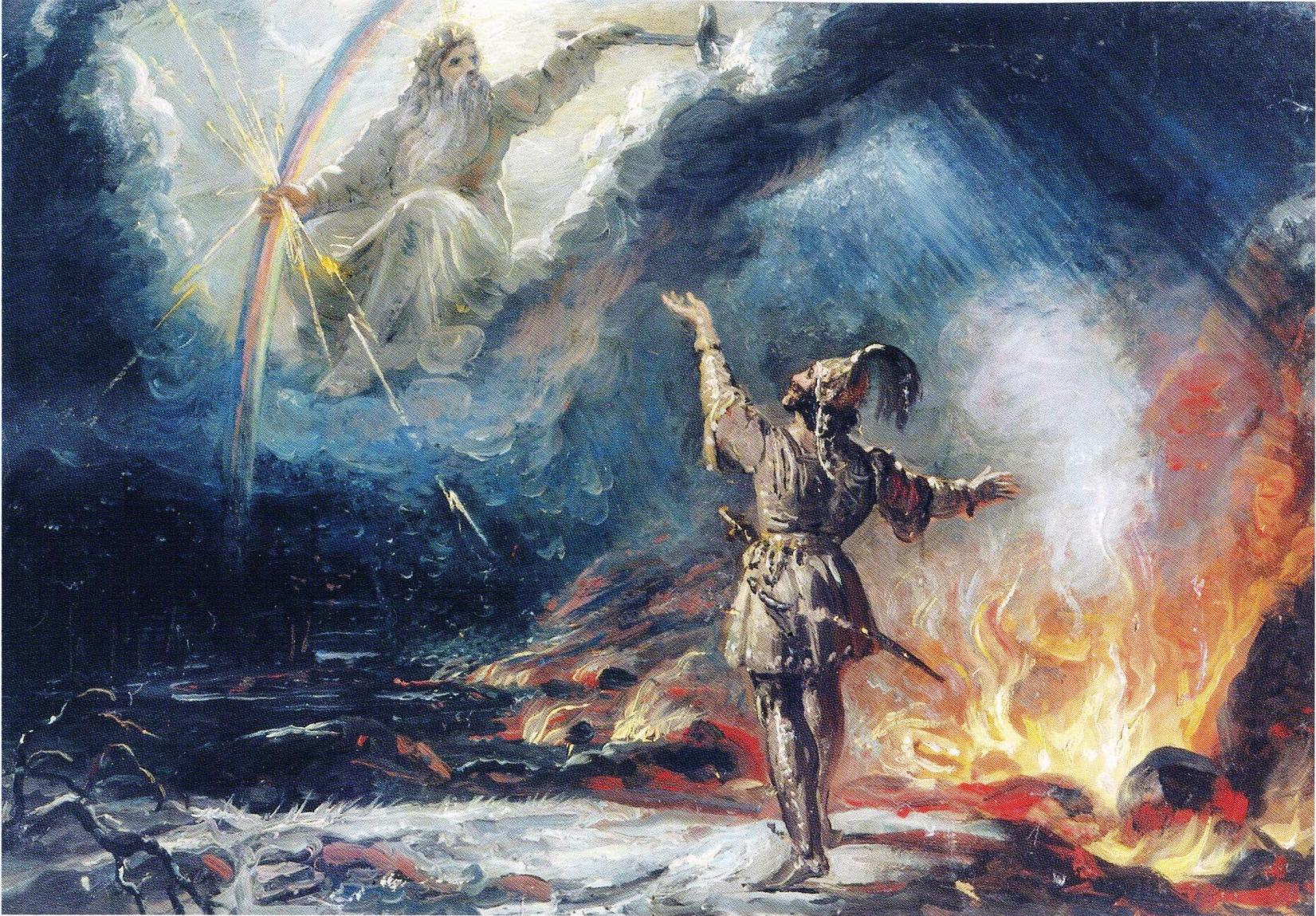
Painting by Robert Ekman in 1867 called Lemminkäinen tulisella järvellä ("Lemminkäinen on the Fiery Lake") where Lemminkäinen asks help from Ukko, the God of Thunder, with crossing the lake in fire on his route to the wedding at Pohjola.

Finnish mythology commonly refers to the folklore of Finnish paganism, of which a modern revival is practised by a small percentage of the Finnish people. It has many shared features with other Finnic mythologies, but also with neighbouring Baltic, Slavic and, Norse mythologies.

Finnish mythology survived within an oral tradition of mythical poem-singing and folklore well into the 19th century.

Of the animals, the most sacred was the bear, whose real name was never uttered out loud, which was thought to be unfavorable to the hunt. The bear (Finnish: karhu) was seen as the embodiment of the forefathers, and for this reason it was called by many circumlocutions: mesikämmen 'mead-paw', otso 'browed one', kontio 'dweller of the land' and metsän kultaomena 'the golden apple of the forest'. It was not strictly seen as a god.

== History of study ==
The first historical mention of Finnish folk religion was by the bishop and Lutheran reformer Mikael Agricola (1510–1557) in the preface to his 1551 Finnish translation of the Psalms. Agricola supplied a list of purported deities of the Häme (Swedish: Tavastia) and Karjala (Karelia). It detailed twelve deities in each region with their supposed functions briefly set out in verse form. (Some commentators state that only eleven deities were listed for Häme, not counting Agricola's mention of Piru, the Devil). Due to the lists, Agricola is considered to be the father of the study of Finnish religious history and mythology. Later scholars and students commonly quoted Agricola's lists as a historical source; only in the late eighteenth century did scholars begin to critically re-examine Agricola's work, finding that most of the figures on his list were not gods, but local guardian spirits, figures from folk mythology or explanatory legends, cultural heroes, Christian saints under alternative names, and, in one case, a harvest-time festival.

Cristfried Ganander's Mythologia Fennica, published in 1789, was the first truly scholarly foray into Finnish mythology. In the 19th century, research into Finnish folklore intensified. Scholars like Elias Lönnrot, J.F. Cajan, M.A. Castrén, and D.E.D. Europaeus travelled around Finland writing down folk poetry sung by runo (poem) singers, many of whom were tietäjät (traditional ritual specialists). The genres they collected included material like the synnyt (lit. 'origin, birth or aetiology'), which give mythical accounts of the origins of many natural phenomena. From this material Lönnrot edited the Kalevala as well as the Kanteletar. The wealth of folk poetry collected in the 19th century often deals with pre-Christian pagan themes, and has allowed scholars to study Finnish mythology in more detail.

== The origins and the structure of the world ==
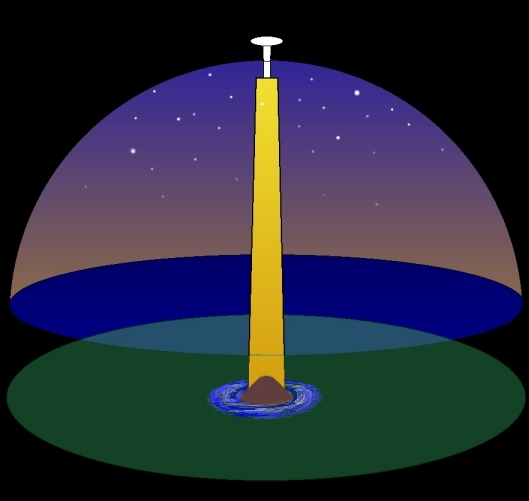
Structure of the world, according to Finnish mythology.

The world was believed to have been formed out of a bird's egg or eggs. The species of the bird and the number of eggs varies between traditions. In the Kalevala the bird is a pochard that lays seven eggs (six of gold and one of iron). Examples from other stories include a swallow, a loon, and a mythical giant eagle, kokko. The sky was believed to be the upper cover of the egg; alternately it was seen as a tent, which was supported by a column at the north pole, below the north star.

The movement of the stars was explained to be caused by the sky-dome's rotation around the North Star and itself. A great whirl was caused at the north pole by the rotation of a column of sky. Through this whirl, souls could exit the world to the land of dead, Tuonela.

Earth was believed to be flat. At the edges of Earth was Lintukoto, "the home of the birds", a warm region in which birds lived during the winter. The Milky Way is called Linnunrata, "the path of the birds", because the birds were believed to move along it to Lintukoto and back. In Modern Finnish usage, the word lintukoto means an imaginary, happy, warm, and peaceful paradise-like place.

Birds also had other significance. Birds brought a human's soul to the body at the moment of birth, and took it away at the moment of death. In some areas, it was necessary to have a wooden bird-figure nearby to prevent the soul from escaping during sleep. This Sielulintu, "the soul-bird", protected the soul from being lost in the paths of dreams.

Waterfowl are very common in tales, and also in stone paintings and carvings, indicating their great significance in the beliefs of ancient Finns.

== Tuonela, the land of the dead ==
Tuonela was the land of dead: an underground home or city for all dead people, without moral judgement. It was a dark and lifeless place, where everybody slept forever. A sufficiently brave shaman could travel to Tuonela in trance to ask for the forefathers' guidance. This required crossing the dark river of Tuonela. If the shaman had a proper reason, a boat would come to take them over. Many times, a shaman's soul would have to trick the guards of Tuonela into thinking that they were actually dead.

== Ukko, the god of sky and thunder ==
Ukko (lit. 'old man') was a god of the sky, weather, and the crops. The Finnish words for thunder, ukkonen 'little Ukko' or ukonilma 'Ukko's weather', are derived from his name. In the Kalevala, he is also called ylijumala 'overgod, Supreme God'. He makes all his appearances in myths solely by natural effects.

Ukko's origins are probably in Baltic Perkons and the older Finnish sky god Ilmarinen. While Ukko took Ilmarinen's position as the Sky God, Ilmarinen's destiny was to turn into a smith-hero, or the god of the rock. In the Kalevala, Ilmarinen is credited with forging the stars on the dome of the sky and the magic mill of plenty, the Sampo.

Ukko's weapon was a hammer, axe or sword, by which he struck lightning. While Ukko and his wife Akka (lit. 'old woman') mated, there was a thunderstorm. He created thunderstorms by riding his chariot over the clouds. The original weapon of Ukko was probably the boat-shaped stone axe of battle axe culture. Ukko's hammer Vasara (lit. 'hammer') probably originally meant the same thing as the boat-shaped stone axe. When stone tools were abandoned in the metal ages, the origins of stone weapons became a mystery. They were believed to be weapons of Ukko left behind after a lightning strike. Shamans collected and held stone axes because they were believed to hold supernatural powers.

== Heroes, gods and spirits ==
Vellamo, the wife of Ahti and the goddess of water, pictured as a mermaid in the coat of arms of Päijät-Häme.

- Aarni, a haltija protector of treasure.
- Ahti, the god of water.
- Ajatar (sometimes Ajattara), an evil forest spirit.
- Äkräs, the haltija of multiple plants, especially rutabagas and potatoes.
- Antero Vipunen, a deceased great tietäjä, sometimes called a giant.
- Etiäinen, a haltija which appears as a premonition.
- Hiisi, originally meaning a sacred grove, later came to mean a giant or demon and goblin-like creatures.
- Hongatar, the haltija of the bear.
- Iku-Turso, one or multiple giants, a sea giant and a war god.
- Ilmarinen, the original god of the sky, later known better as the forger of the sky and god of wind.
- Jumala, a generic name for a major deity. Originally the name given by the Finns to the sky, the sky-god, and the supreme god. The word means god and was later used for the Christian God.
- Kaleva, a primordial giant and father of multiple heroes.
- Kave, an air spirit connected to the lunar cycle, also refers to a group of nature goddesses.
- Kivutar, the goddess of pain.
- Kullervo, a tragic antihero. Model for Túrin Turambar in Tolkien's Silmarillion.
- Kuutar, the goddess of the Moon.
- Käreitär, the haltija of foxes.
- Lemminkäinen, a tietäjä hero.
- Lempo, a fire haltija, came to be associated with demons by Christians.
- Lalli, Finn who slew St. Henry of Uppsala on the ice of Lake Köyliö, according to a legend.
- Louhi, the matriarch of Pohjola, hostess of the Underworld.
- Maaemä, the goddess of earth.
- Menninkäinen, originally spirits of the dead, later came to be seen as a fairy spirit or leprechaun of some sort.
- Mielikki, the goddess of the forest.
- Nyyrikki, a forest deity, son of Tapio.
- Näkki, a fearsome spirit of water.
- Otso, the spirit of bear (one of many circumlocutory epithets).
- Päivätär, the goddess of the Sun.
- Pekko, the god of barley and brewing.
- Piru, demons.
- Rahko, someone who tries to paint the Moon in tar but gets stuck on the Moon, causing the lunar cycle.
- Sampsa Pellervoinen, the haltija of vegetation.
- Soini, a son of Kaleva who was sold into slavery, later created swiddens in Ostrobothnia.
- Tapio, the god of the forest.
- Tellervo, a forest deity, daughter of Tapio and Mielikki.
- Tonttu, generally benign tutelary. Originally, a patron of cultivated land, keeper of lot.
- Tuulikki, a forest deity, daughter of Tapio and Mielikki.
- Ukko, a god of thunder and weather, related to Thor (Estonian Taara).
- Vellamo, the goddess of water.
- Virankannos, a god of fertility.
- Väinämöinen, a divine tietäjä, smith of songs.

== Places ==
- Kyöpelinvuori (Raatikko); where women who die as virgins go, and later a place where witches meet at Easter.
- Tuonela; (also Manala, Pohjola) abode of the dead, Underworld.
- Väinölä (also known as the Land of Kalevala)
- Pohjola
- Aarnivalkea, an eternal flame marking the spot of buried treasure
- Lintukoto, a mythical place where migratory birds were believed to live in wintertime, the word is used as a metaphor for a happy place in Finnish.

== Animals ==
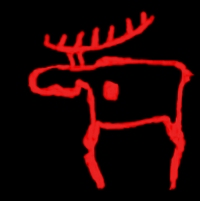

- Brown bear; the bear was considered the most sacred of animals in Finnish mythology, only referred to by euphemisms (see taboo and noa-name). The killing of a bear was followed by a great feast in honour of the bear (peijaiset), where a substantial part of the celebrations consisted of convincing the bear's spirit that it had died accidentally and hadn't been murdered. Afterwards, the bear's skull was hung high upon a pine tree so its spirit could re-enter the heavens. Kalevala on the bear.
- Swan of Tuonela; (Tuonelan joutsen).
- Elk of Hiisi; (Hiiden hirvi).

== Artifacts ==
- The Sampo, a magical artifact that brought good fortune to its holder. According to Lönnrot's interpretation in the Kalevala, it was a mill that made flour, salt, and gold out of thin air.
- Väinämöinen's magic kantele which he made from the jaws of a huge pike and a young lady's hair.
- Väinämöinen's great sword, which shines like the sun and is extraordinarily sharp.

== See also ==
- Estonian mythology
- Finnish paganism
- Modern Finnish paganism
