= Battle of Tuulos =

- Part of Continuation War
Date	September 1941
Location	Tuulos, Ladoga Karelia, Finland
Result	Finnish victory

Belligerents
Finland	Soviet Union

Units involved
23rd Infantry Regiment; Finnish Air Force	

The Battle of Tuulos (Finnish: Tuuloksen taistelu) took place between Finland and the Soviet Union during the Continuation War of 1941 and the Finnish reconquering of Ladoga Karelia. The Finnish offensive commenced on 4 September.

The Finnish commander of the 23rd Infantry Regiment successfully breached Soviet perimeters and destroyed Soviet artillery pieces and supply lines with little Soviet resistance. The attack was assisted by the Finnish Air Force, which bombed Soviet positions and assisted the 23rd Infantry Regiment.
