= Menninkäinen =

Spirits in Finnish mythology

In Finnish mythology and lore, the menninkäinen (pronounced [ˈmenːiŋkæi̯nen]) were originally described as spirits that lived in isolated places and were considered generally friendly to humans. Over time the mythology of the term evolved with the menninkäinen described as goblin-like creatures. These creatures are believed to be similar to leprechauns as they guard treasures and enjoy riddles and games of dominance. Sources disagree over where menninkäinen reside with some sources calling them "industrial workers" in urban environments, and others as forest dwellers.
