= Haltija =

Guard and protector in Finnish mythology

In Finnish mythology, a haltija is a supernatural inhabitant of a specific place and a protector of living beings, living in an invisible environment but able to show themselves to humans. A haltija could be the supernatural original inhabitant and guardian of a place or the original mother of an animal species. A person who died and was buried to their home could also become a haltija. A haltija of a locality is a solitary creature who protects their home, its nature and peace. A haltija of an animal species protects their continued existence by returning dead animals back to earth.

Deity-like figures in Finnish mythology are often described as jumala and/or haltija. Risto Pulkkinen described a jumala as a being who rules over a wider concept, such as water, while a haltija is more localized, ruling over a specific body of water. According to him, there is only a small number of beings in Finnish paganism which could be called jumala, but a wide variety of haltija beings. Thus, a haltija is a ruler of a domain smaller than a god's.

== Etymology ==
The word is possibly derived from the Proto-Norse *halđiaz or *halđia- ("hold", compare to Old Swedish samhälde "society"; uphälde "livelihood")—although this is not the only possible etymology. It can also be derived from the Finnish verb hallita, which means "to rule", "to command", "to master". In Swedish, a similar creature is called rå (from råda "to rule"). Lauri Harvilahti suggested a Baltic origin: žaltys means a "grass snake", which was considered a household spirit.

The word is also used in modern Finnish to mean, depending on the context, holder, occupant, lord, master, owner-occupier, occupier, possessor, bearer, or owner. In Estonian mythology a similar being is called haldjas; a holder or administrator is haldaja. Similar words exist in other Baltic Finnic languages as well: Izhorian haltias, haltiaine, haltē, halteine; Karelian haltie; Ludic haĺgī. In Votic, altia, altiaz, altē̮, halt́śiaina means a "malevolent ghost".

Haltija is sometimes written as haltia. Nowadays, this more old-fashioned spelling often refers to the elves in Tolkien's books or other fantasy literature. There has been controversy over the correct spelling of the word over the 20th and 21st centuries, but the Institute for the Languages of Finland supported haltija as the primary word until 2013, when it stated the two ways of spelling to be equal for the "fairytale creature".

== Types ==
There are many different kinds of haltijas. One is the forest maiden, metsänneitsyt, inspired by the Swedish Skogsrå, known in Uusimaa, Western Finland and among the Finns of Northern Sweden. In Western Finland, the names used for the forest maiden also included haapaneitsyt ("aspen maiden"), and in Northern Sweden, metsänemäntä ("forest mistress"). Just like the Skogsrå, the Finnish forest maiden was beautiful from the front but ugly from the back, and she tried to trick men into sexual encounters with her.

The haltija of a homestead is called maanhaltija ("land haltija") or tonttu, which is the Finnish version of Swedish tomte. The words tonttu and Swedish tomt come from tontti ("building lot" and "building site"). In Swedish, such local spirits are also later referred to as a tomtegubbe ("old man of the homestead"). The kotihaltija ("home haltija") or kotitonttu lives in every home. It takes care of the house and it is important to treat it with respect. The saunatonttu lives in the sauna and protects it but also makes sure that people do not behave improperly in it, and the myllytonttu is the haltija of a mill. Tonttu are such more limited to a specific location than haltijas in general. Joulutonttu is Finnish for Christmas elf.

When building a house to a new location, one had to bring offerings of water, bread, money and charcoal to the land haltija.

The barn haltija could appear in the form of a cat, which is why it was important in some houses to treat the barn cat well in all ways and feed it regularly.

In nature, there are metsänhaltijat ("forest haltijas") in the forest and vedenhaltijat ("water haltijas") in water, among other types. A metsänhaltija could help humans but also punish them if they didn't respect the forest. People offered sacrifices to haltijas at sacred places such as yard trees. The water haltija has been described as having large brown eyes, long black hair and a voice like a woman's. She also has cows. Their names in runic songs are usually Kirjo, Karjo and Haluna. Other cow names which might appear are Verkuna, Maatinki, Omena, Torstikki and Perjakka.

The original sky god of Baltic Finnic paganism, Ilmarinen, was demoted from the position of the sky god to a wind deity-haltija being after the Baltic mythology inspired thunder god Ukko was added into the pantheon. What is a jumala (god) and a haltija is a matter of definition. In Pulkkinen's opinion, only Ukko, Tapio, Ahti and possibly the ruler of the underworld Louhi can be considered jumalas; all other deities in Finnish mythology would go into the haltija category.

There are even personal haltijas: the haltija soul is a part of the plural human soul in Finno-Ugric animism. The haltija soul maintained a person's wellbeing and success. If the haltija soul left a human's body, it could result in disease, dilapidation, poverty and the weakening of one's quality of life, even resulting in death. Across Finland and Karelia, this soul has had multiple names, including hahmo ("figure"), haamu and aave ("ghost"), emuu ("mother"), luonto ("nature"), onni and lykky ("luck", latter after Swedish lycka "luck"), and säästi (after Russian счастье schast'ye "luck").

== Väki ==
Collectively, haltijas can be called väki ("power", "magic power", "folk"). For instance, there is metsänväki, the "(magic) power of the forest" in the older sense, which has gained the meaning of "forest folk". In this context, the word väki can refer to them as a folk, their magical powers, or usually both at the same time.

The complicated word väki was defined by Kaarle Krohn first and foremost as haltija-like beings in 1914. In 1916, Uno Harva brought forth the now common view of väki as an impersonal supernatural force. Later research has connected the word väki to mana, even treating them as equivalents. Anna-Leena Siikala and Matti Sarmela used the term to explain the change in Finnish folk religion as people shifted from hunter-gathering and to farming communities: hunter-gatherers' shaman communicated with the souls of the dead, while the agrarian tietäjä handled impersonal väki. Laura Stark wrote that väki as a concept is much more narrow than mana, while Tenka Issakainen argued the opposite: väki is not a special magic power, but any kind of power in general, not necessarily supernatural. Mythological väki can also differ: tulenväki (väki of fire) is in fire itself, but kallionväki (väki of rock) tends to only use rock as a conduit, not originating from it.

== See also ==
- Brownie (Scotland and England)
- Domovoi (Slavic region)
- Elf (Germanic, Nordic, and Celtic regions)
- Wight (Germanic region)
- Kikimora (Slavic region)
- Kobold (Germany)
- Lares (Roman mythology)
- Sprite (England)
- Tomte (Sweden)
- Rå (Scandinavia)
- Landvættir (Iceland)
