= Olonets Karelia =

Historical cultural region of East Karelia

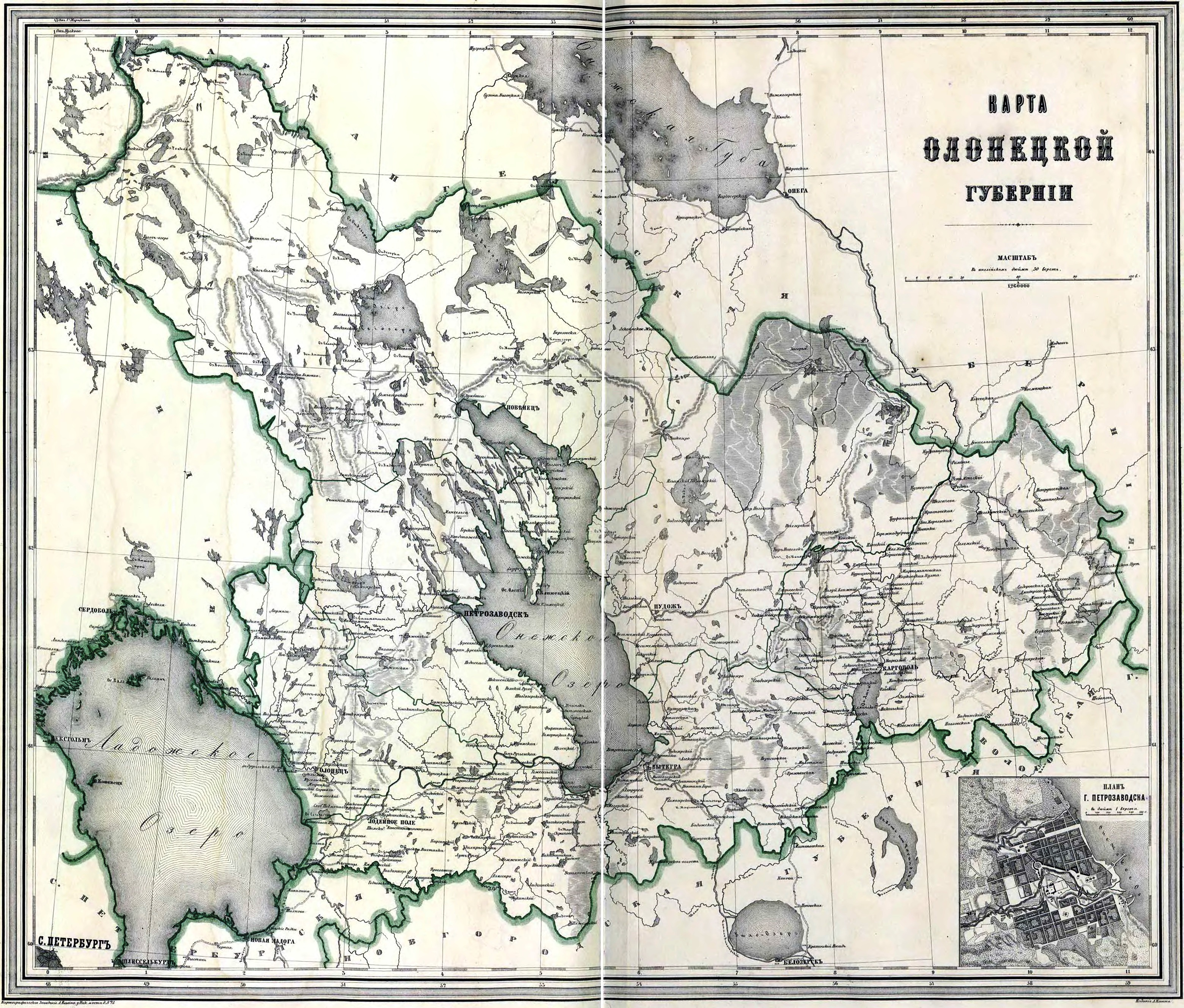
Olonets Governorate, which was sometimes used to demarcate Olonets Karelia

Olonets Karelia (Finnish: Aunuksen Karjala, shortened. Aunus; Karelian: Anuksen Karjala, shortened. Anus; Russian: Олонецкая Карелия, romanized: Olonetskaja Karelija) is a historical and cultural region and the southern portion of East Karelia, which is currently part of Russia. Olonets Karelia is located between the other historical regions of Ladoga Karelia, to its west, White Karelia, to its north, the River Svir, to its south and Lake Onega on its eastern side. Olonets Karelia is home to its own dialect of the Karelian language, which is known as Livvi Karelian or sometimes as 'Olonets Karelian'.

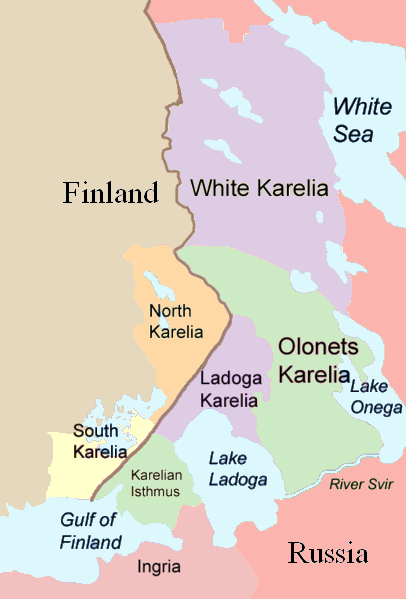
Parts of Karelia, as they are divided today

The largest city in the Olonets Karelia region is Petrozavodsk, followed by Kondopoga, Segezha and Medvezhyegorsk.

== History ==
Olonets Karelia has largely been under Russian control over the course of its history, despite its ethnic Karelian population; being under the control of the Novgorod Republic since the 1100s, and later falling under Muscovite control by around 1478. Olonets Karelia became a governate of the Russian Empire in 1801, being known as the Olonets Governorate. Today the Karelians remain only a small majority due to Soviet influence and control.

Olonets Karelia was momentarily under Finnish control during the Continuation War, however the region was retaken by the Soviet Red Army during the Vyborg-Petrozavodsk Offensive.

== See also ==
- Olonets, town in which the region is named after.
- Olonetsky District, district named after the town of Olonets.
- Aunus expedition, Finnish military expedition for the annexation of the Olonets Karelia region during the Heimosodat.
- White Karelia
