= White Karelia =

Historical region in Russia

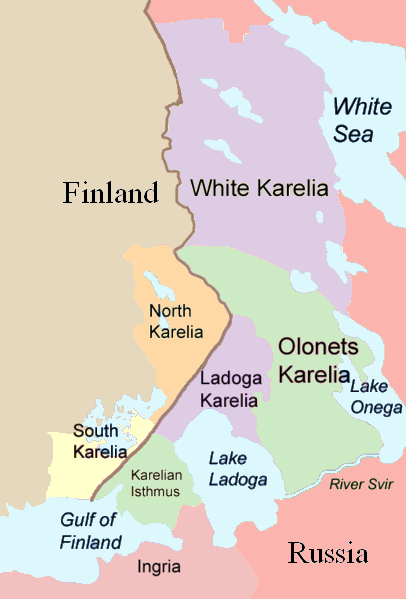
Map of the traditional Karelian regions

White Karelia (Russian: Беломо́рская Каре́лия, romanized: Belomorskaja Karelija, lit. 'White Sea Karelia'; North Karelian and Finnish: Vienan Karjala or simply Viena; Swedish: Vitahavskarelen) is a historical region in Northern Europe, comprising the northernmost part of Karelia, and of the Republic of Karelia in Russia. It is bordered by the White Sea to the east, Murmansk Oblast to the north, Finland (Kainuu and North Ostrobothnia) to the west, and the Muyezersky and Segezhsky Districts of the Republic of Karelia to the south.

The surface area of White Karelia is approximately 67,000 square kilometres (26,000 sq mi), and it has a population of about 100,000. The area is largely undeveloped in terms of population centers and infrastructure, and much of it remains wilderness.

Finnish author Elias Lönnrot (1802–1884) collected most of the poems and materials for the epic poem Kalevala from the White Karelian poetry villages, which collected Finno-Karelian folklore.

The East Karelian Republic of 1919–1920 formed in the area of White Karelia during the Russian Civil War.

== See also ==
- Northern Karelian dialect
- Viena expedition
- Kalevala#Lönnrot's field trips
- Olonets Karelia
