= Runic song =

Baltic Finnic oral poetry and national epic

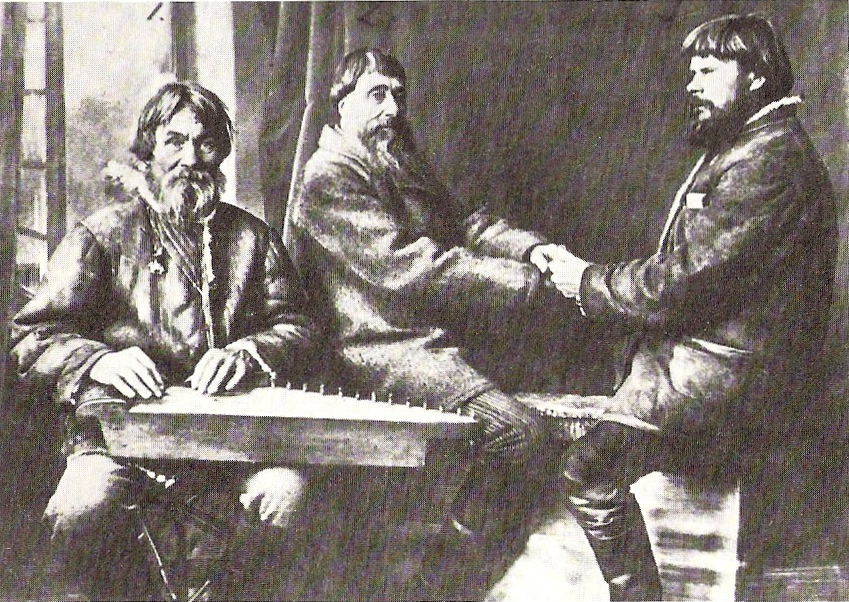
Runic singers from Ladoga Karelia. From left: Iivana Shemeikka, Iivana Onoila, and Konstantin Kuokka

Runic song (Note: Estonian: Regilaul, Finnish and Karelian: Runolaulut), also referred to as Rune song, Runo song, or Kalevala song, is a form of oral poetry and national epic historically practiced among the Baltic Finnic peoples. It includes the Finnish epic poems Kalevala and Kanteletar, as well as the Estonian Kalevipoeg. Estonian and Finnish researchers suggest the term runosong for English translation, or local terms, such as Estonian regilaul, Seto leelo or Finnish runolaulu when it is about regional tradition.

== Description ==
Runic song is typically monophonic among most Baltic Finnic groups, though it is generally polyphonic when practiced among the Seto. Runic song usually does not contain rhyming couplets, but is frequently heard in alliterative trochaic tetrameter, or Kalevala meter. Runic song is usually sung in 5/4, though quadruple metre and sextuple metre singing also exists.

In addition to their musical character, runic singers also are required to follow certain practices as they sang, such as Karelian runic singers holding hands while singing in a call and response fashion. Ingrian runic singing includes additional choralists. Vocal ranges usually correspond with the range of a kantele. The term "runic song" does not include Livonian or Vepsian song, though they are related.

== History ==
Though runic song has existed for at least a millennium, it only began to be transcribed in 1797. Efforts to write down runic song acquired new urgency in Finland after the Russian victory in the 1808–1809 Finnish War and its subsequent annexation of Finland. This led to the publication of the Kalevala by Elias Lönnrot in 1835. Similarly, runic song largely began to be recorded in Estonia in 1888 as part of the country's national revival, though the first transcriptions reach as far back as Johann Gottfried Herder's 1778–1779 publication of Folk Songs. The 1888 runic song transcription process in Estonia largely began following an appeal by Jakob Hurt to collect written Estonian folklore. Karl August Hermann subsequently called on Estonians to collect folk tunes. However, the appeal largely failed in its endeavour due to the significant volume of self-authored works which were submitted, as well as low levels of musical literacy. Another push, under the guidance of Oskar Kallas and including students from both the University of Tartu and the Saint Petersburg Conservatory was much more successful; over 13,139 folk songs were collected between 1904 and 1914.

== Notable runic singers ==
- Larin Paraske
- Arhippa Perttunen

== Notable runic songs ==
- Kalevala
- Kanteletar
- Kalevipoeg
