= Ladoga Karelia =

Historical region of Karelia

Ladoga Karelia while part of Finland Central Karelia Hiitola and Pälkjärvi Border Karelia

Ladoga Karelia (Finnish: Laatokan Karjala, Swedish: Ladogakarelen, Russian: Ладожская Карелия, romanized: Ladožskaja Karelija, Карельское Приладожье, Karelskoje Priladožje or Северное Приладожье, Severnoje Priladožje) is a historical region of Karelia, currently largely in Russia. Today, the term refers to the part of the Republic of Karelia in the Russian Federation comprising the south-west part of the Republic, specifically Lakhdenpokhsky District, Pitkyarantsky District and Sortavala District. This region is on the northern littoral of Lake Ladoga, which borders Olonets Karelia to the East, Leningrad Oblast (Karelian Isthmus) to the south-west and the North Karelia region of Finland to the west.

== History ==
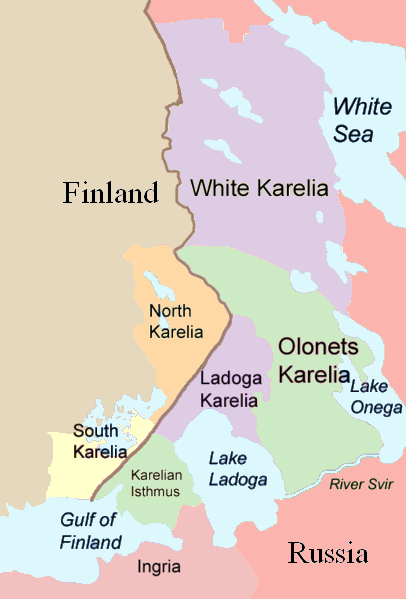
Historical regions of Karelia

When state formation first began in the region, Ladoga Karelia belonged to the Novgorod Republic; thereafter it came under Russian rule, as part of Kexholm County. Along with Kexholm County, Ladoga Karelia was transferred to Sweden through the Treaty of Stolbovo in 1617. Sweden lost Ladoga Karelia to Russia in the Treaty of Nystad in 1721, after which the area became part of the Viborg Governorate, also known as Old Finland. Following the Russian conquest of the rest of Finland, this so-called "Old Finland" was united, under the name Viborg Province, with the newly constituted Grand Duchy of Finland in 1812. The Ladoga Karelia was then divided into Central Karelia and Border Karelia. The area remained part of Finland following its independence from Russia in 1917.

Ladoga Karelia was fought over by Finland and the Soviet Union during the 1939–40 Winter War (ended with the Moscow Peace Treaty) and the 1941–44 Continuation War. Following these conflicts, only small parts of Ladoga Karelia remained in Finland. Some form part of the South Karelia region: the Finnish parts of Parikkala, Saari and Uukuniemi municipalities are now part of Parikkala municipality; the former Simpele municipality is now part of the current Rautjärvi municipality. Meanwhile, Kolkka, the westernmost part of the former Korpiselkä municipality that remained in Finland, was joined to Tuupovaara municipality, which in turn is now part of Joensuu and North Karelia province.

=== Central Karelia ===
The historic region of Central Karelia (Finnish: Keski-Karjala) was divided into the following municipalities and hundreds (kihlakunnat):

- Harlu (Sortavalan kihlakunta)
- Jaakkima (Kurkijoen kihlakunta)
- Kurkijoki (Kurkijoen kihlakunta)
- Lahdenpohja (Kurkijoen kihlakunta)
- Lumivaara (Kurkijoen kihlakunta)
- Parikkala (Kurkijoen kihlakunta)
- Ruskeala (Sortavalan kihlakunta)
- Saari (Kurkijoen kihlakunta)
- Simpele (Kurkijoen kihlakunta)
- Sortavala
- Sortavalan maalaiskunta, including Valamo (Sortavalan kihlakunta)
- Uukuniemi (Sortavalan kihlakunta)

Hiitola was also sometimes read as belonging to Ladoga Karelia. Pälkjärvi belonged to the parish of Ilomantsi and thus to the county of Kuopio. Because of its geographical position and historical background, however, it could also be connected to Laatokan Karjala.

=== Border Karelia ===
In Border Karelia (Finnish: Raja-Karjala), the majority language was Karelian and most of the people were Orthodox Christians. Most Karelians in the area spoke South Karelian (suvikarjala, not to be confused with the southeastern dialects of Finnish), while Livvi was spoken in Salmi and the Hyrsylä salient of Suojärvi.

The historic region of Border Karelia was divided into the following municipalities (all belonging to Salmin kihlakunta):

- Impilahti
- Korpiselkä
- Salmi
- Soanlahti
- Suistamo
- Suojärvi
