= Kolmikulma =

Park in Helsinki, Finland

- Diana Park
- Trekanten
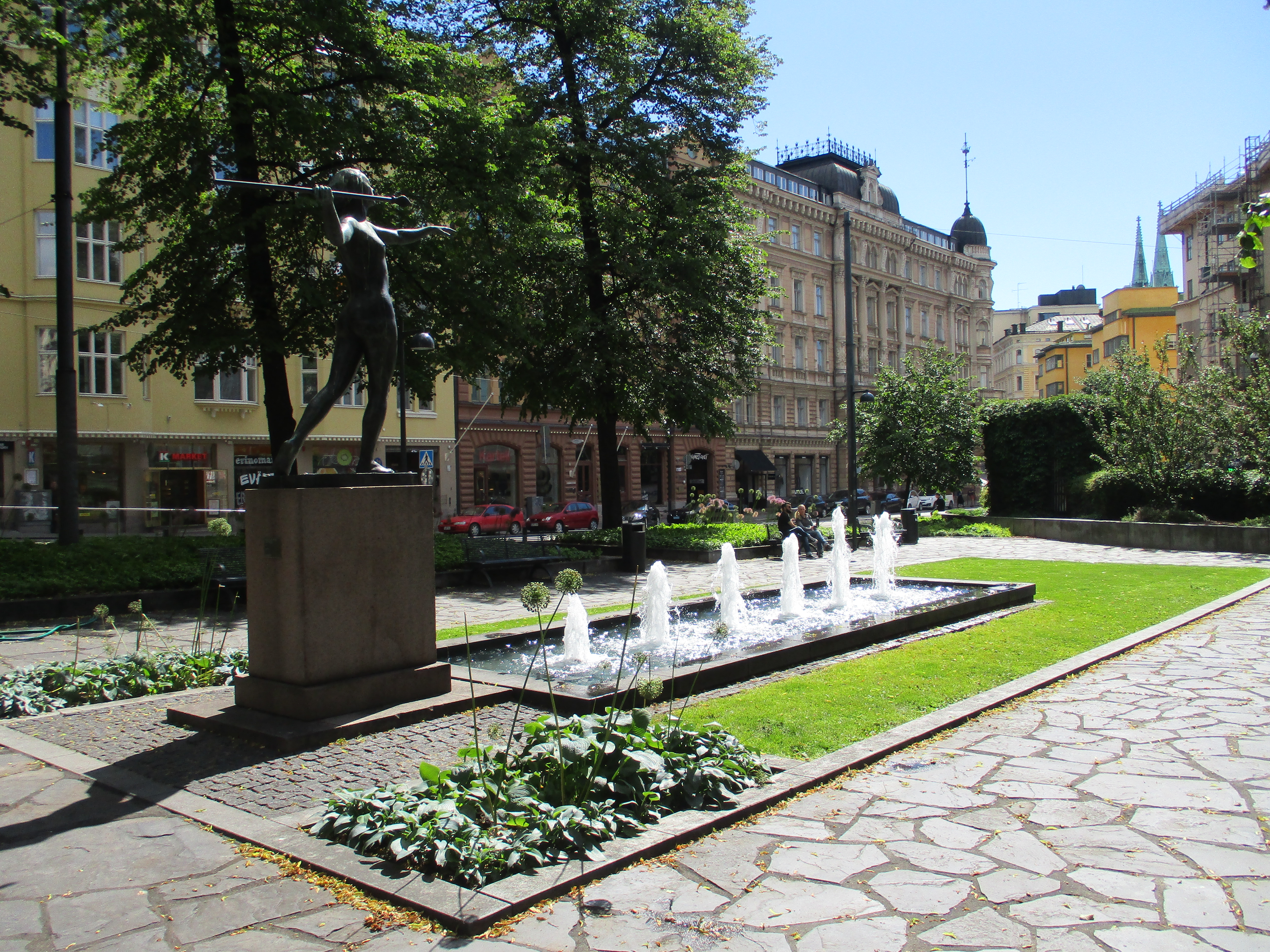
- The Kolmikulma Park with fountain and the Tellervo sculpture.

- Location within Helsinki (mainland)
- Type: Urban park
- Location: Kaartinkaupunki, Helsinki, Finland
- Coordinates: 60°09′54″N 24°56′36″E

Kolmikulma (Swedish: Trekanten; literally meaning "Triangle"), also known as the Diana Park, is a small, rectangular triangular-shaped park located in the Kaartinkaupunki district in the city center of Helsinki, Finland. It is limited by the Yrjönkatu, Uudenmaankatu and Erottajankatu streets. The park was renovated in 2006 and 2007.

The Kolmikulma Park is located at the intersection of the three districts; although the park belongs to the Kaartinkaupunki district, there is the Punavuori district just southwest of the quarter and the Kamppi district to the northwest. The triangular nature of the park is due to its location on the border of two grid pattern areas in different directions. The houses surrounding the block were built mainly in the late 19th and early 20th centuries. For a long time, the National Board of Customs operated in the house north of the park. On Yrjönkatu, next to the park, there was a movie theatre Diana for 25 years and then a cinema called Lasten Cinema. The Swedish-language children's theater Unga Teatern operates in the same space.

In the park there is a sculpture of Tellervo, daughter of Tapio, designed by sculptor Yrjö Liipola and completed in 1928, which depicts the goddess of the forest Tellervo throwing a spear. The statue is also commonly referred to as Diana, the goddess of the hunting of ancient legends, which is why the park is named the Diana Park.

Tram line 10 (Surgical Hospital–Pikku Huopalahti) runs along Erottajankatu and bus line 24 (Ullanlinna–Seurasaari) runs along Erottajankatu to the north, Uudenmaankatu and Yrjönkatu to the south. In 2008–2012, there was also the end of tram line 9 leading to East Pasila at the edge of the park. Another of the starting points of the Crown Bridges tram connection to the center of Helsinki is planned for Kolmikulma.

== See also ==
- Esplanadi
