= Kaartinkaupunki =

Coordinates: 60°09′55″N 024°56′56″E

Kaartinkaupunki Gardesstaden
- Helsinki Subdivision
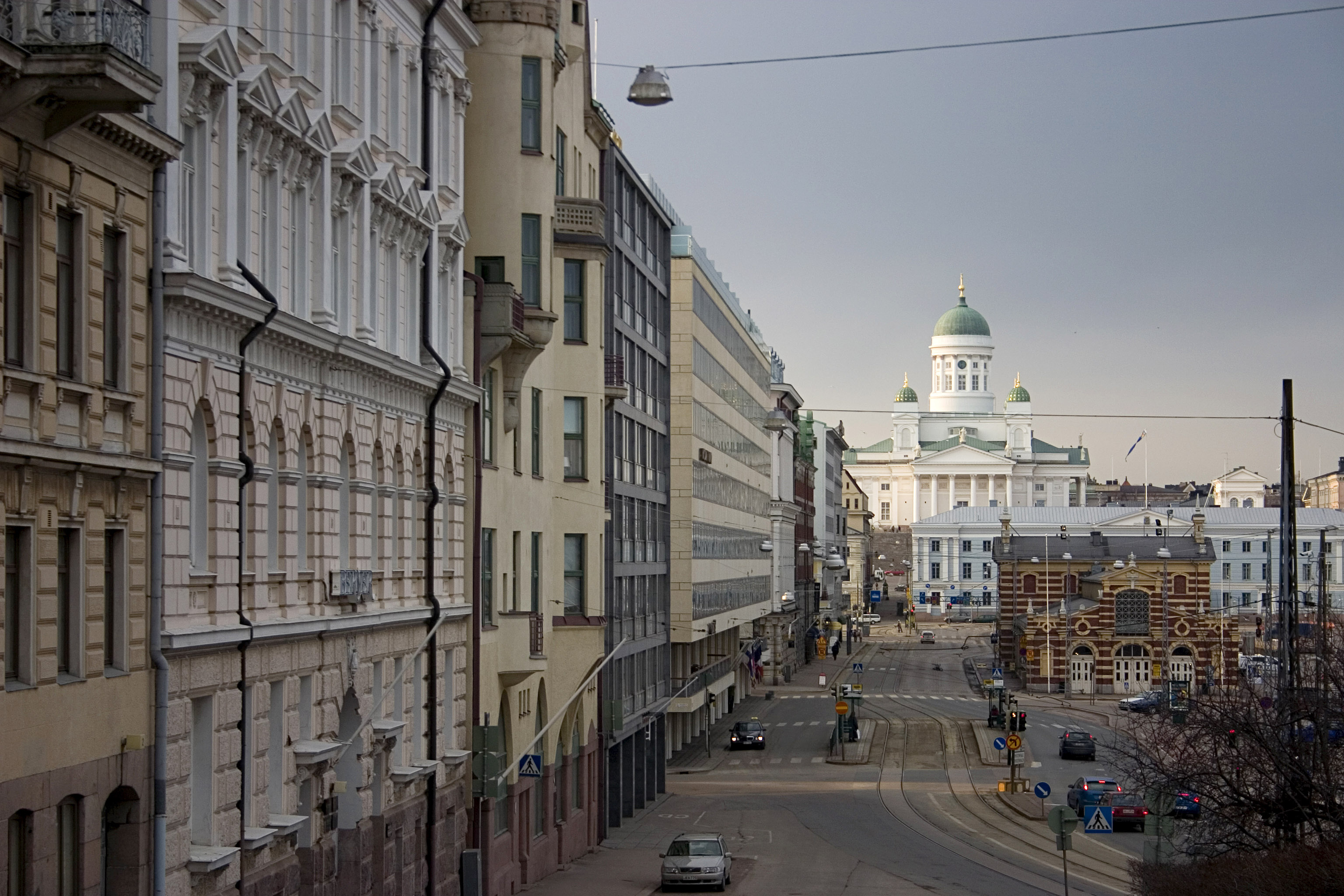
- Vanha kauppahalli on the right and the Helsinki Cathedral in the background

- Position of Kaartinkaupunki within Helsinki
- Country: Finland
- Region: Uusimaa
- Sub-region: Greater Helsinki
- Municipality: Helsinki
- District: Southern
- Subdivision regions: none
- Area: 0.33 km^{2} (0.13 sq mi)
- Population (2013): 999
  - Density: 2,291/km^{2} (5,930/sq mi)
- Postal codes: 00130
- Subdivision number: 03
- Neighbouring subdivisions: Katajanokka; Kamppi; Kluuvi; Kruununhaka; Punavuori; Ullanlinna

Kaartinkaupunki (Finnish pronunciation: [ˈkɑːrtiŋˌkɑu̯puŋki], Swedish: Gardesstaden) is a neighbourhood in the southern part of Helsinki, Finland.

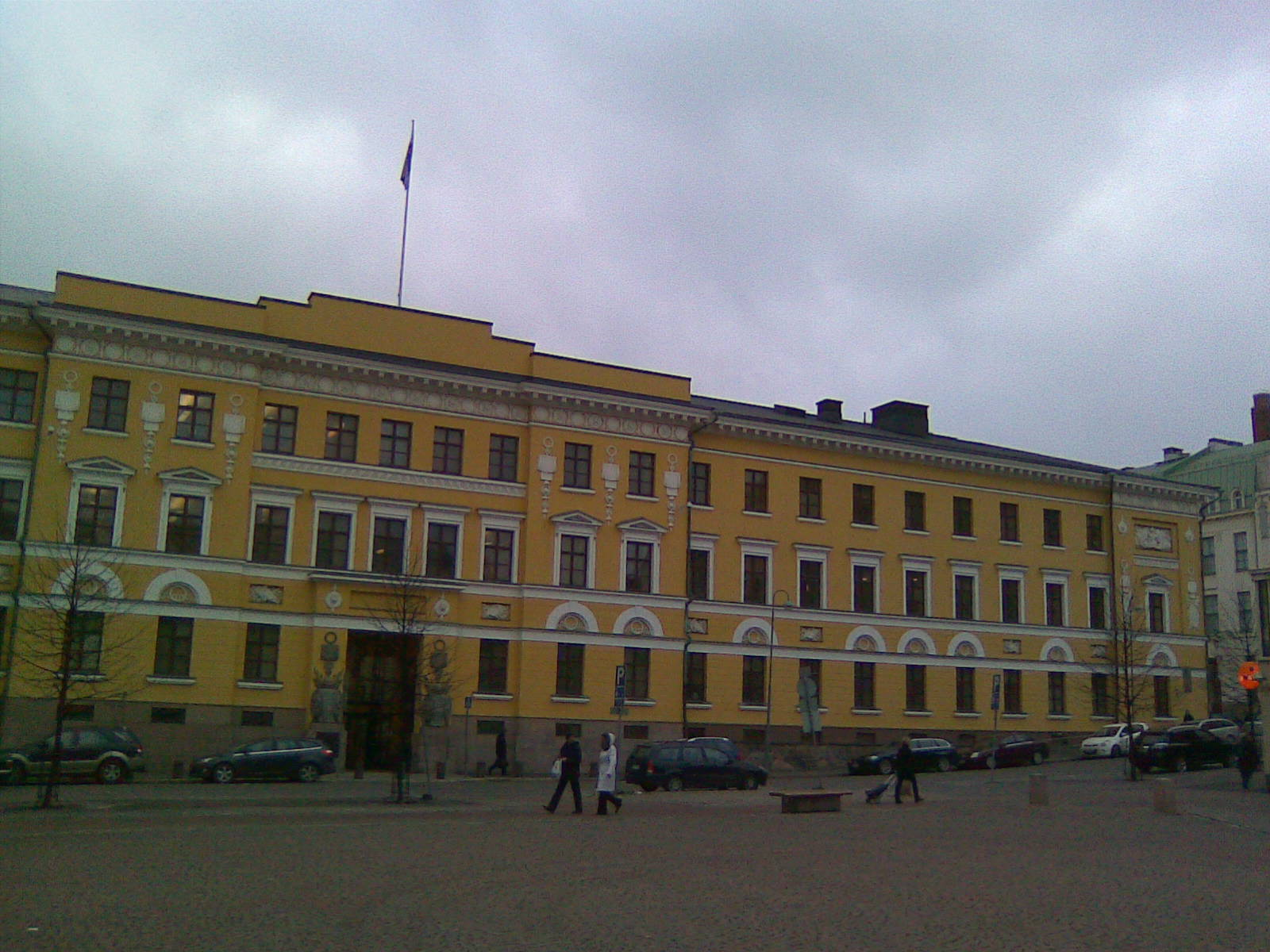
The Ministry of Defence

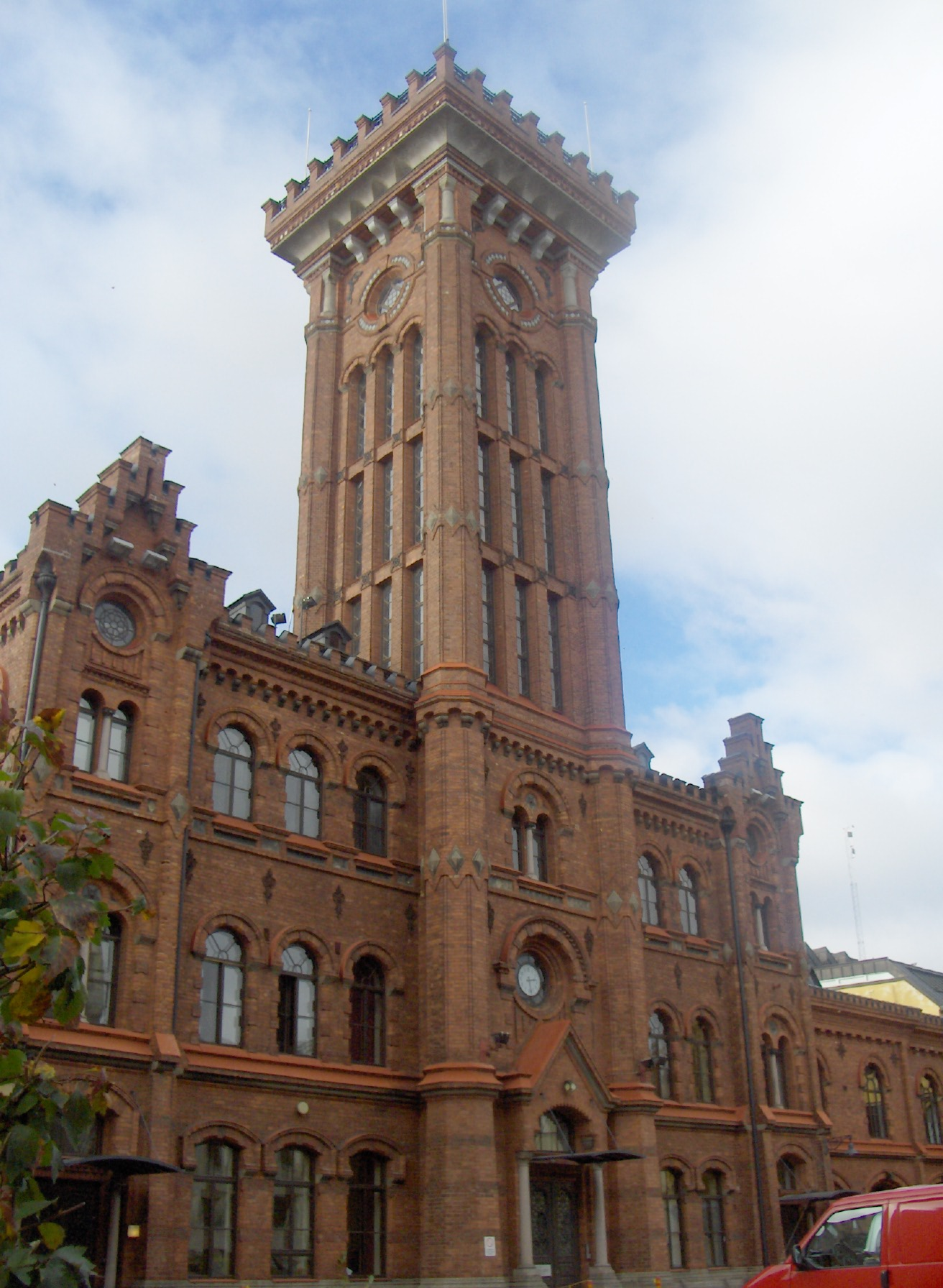
Erottaja fire station, Korkeavuorenkatu

Kaartinkaupunki consists of the area between the Esplanadi park and the Tähtitornin vuori park. Its area was first confirmed in 1812, but the neighbourhood was only named in 1959. It is neighbourhood number 3 in Helsinki, belonging to the Ullanlinna district and to the Southern main district. Kaartinkaupunki was named after the old Russian army barracks located near Kasarmitori. The oldest part of the barracks was built in 1822. It was originally built as a residence for the Helsinki training battalion, which later became the Guard of Finland.

The neighbourhood has a land area of 0.33 square kilometres (0.13 sq mi). In 2005, it had a population of 881, and in late 2003, it had 11,001 jobs.

Kaartinkaupunki includes the Esplanadi park, the Helsinki Market Square, and the streets of Pohjois- and Etelä-Esplanadi. It does not include any of the buildings on Pohjoisesplanadi, because they belong to Kruununhaka or Kluuvi. One of the main streets in the area is Korkeavuorenkatu. The precise location of the neighbourhood can be seen on the Helsinki city plan map.

== Sights ==
- The filling of the Helsinki Market Square area and its piers was started in 1813. The food market was moved from the Helsinki Senate Square to the current location of Havis Amanda in 1818. The square was paved from 1830 to 1835.
- The Cholera basin is a harbour basin located next to the Market Square. It is popular among fishers selling their fish and tourist ships. The Helsinki harbour rail, going to Katajanokka, used to pass by its side. A part of the original rail tracks and a turning bridge, used by pedestrians, remain of the harbour rail. The harbour rail was in use from 1894 to 1980.
- The Esplanadi park was leveled starting from 1818. The oldest part of the park, the so-called Kappeliesplanadi ("Chapel Esplanade") was built starting from 1824. The park could only grow to its current proportions after the Kluuvinlahti bay was filled.
- The smaller Kolmikulma park, also known as the "Diana Park", is known for its rectangular shape and the Tellervo sculpture depicting Finnish goddess of forests.
- The Smolna, the celebration hall of the Finnish Senate, was designed by Carl Ludvig Engel. It was completed in 1824 at Eteläesplanadi 6 and served as the residence for the Governor General of Finland for a long time.
- The Esplanadikappeli was designed by Axel Hampus Dalström. It was opened in 1867 and still serves as a restaurant.
- The Old Market Hall (Vanha kauppahalli) was completed in 1889 and still serves as a place to buy food.
- The Swedish Theatre was built at Pohjoisesplanadi 2 in the place of an earlier theatre building in 1866. The building got its current appearance in 1936.
- The oldest parts of the Erottaja fire station are from 1891, at Korkeavuorenkatu 26. The building also hosts a fire station museum. The base of the building has a plaque saying: "The Helsinki air defense was conducted from a bunker situated here from 1943 to 1944".
- The Kasarmitori area was leveled in 1815. Its name was confirmed in 1836. The money spent to level Kasarmitori was originally reserved to build a canal from Kauppatori to Kluuvinlahti along Esplanadi, to improve fire safety.
- The Rikhardinkatu library is from 1881.
- The Wasa-Aktie-Bank Building is a Gothic-revival design by Swedish-born architect John Settergren built in 1898–99.
- The Päivälehti museum is located on Ludviginkatu.
- The Finnish museum of building design was built in 1899 at Kasarmikatu 24.
- The Design museum was built in 1895 at Korkeavuorenkatu 23.
- The German church was built in 1864 at Unionikatu 1.

== Literature ==
- Kaija Ollila, Kirsti Toppari: Puhvelista Punatulkkuun. Helsingin vanhoja kortteleita, Helsinki 1975, ISBN 951-9133-58-5.
- Henrik Lilius: Esplanadi 1800-luvulla, 1984, ISBN 87-85176-20-6.
- Elämää kaupungissa: Memoria 12, Helsinki 1998, ISBN 951-718-147-7.
- Riitta Mäkinen: Yksi talo, tuhat tarinaa. Agronomitalon historia 1901-2001, Helsinki 2001, ISBN 951-96301-4-7.
- Seija Sartti et al.: Eteläranta 10, 2002, ISBN 952-91-4919-0.
