= Läroverket för gossar och flickor =

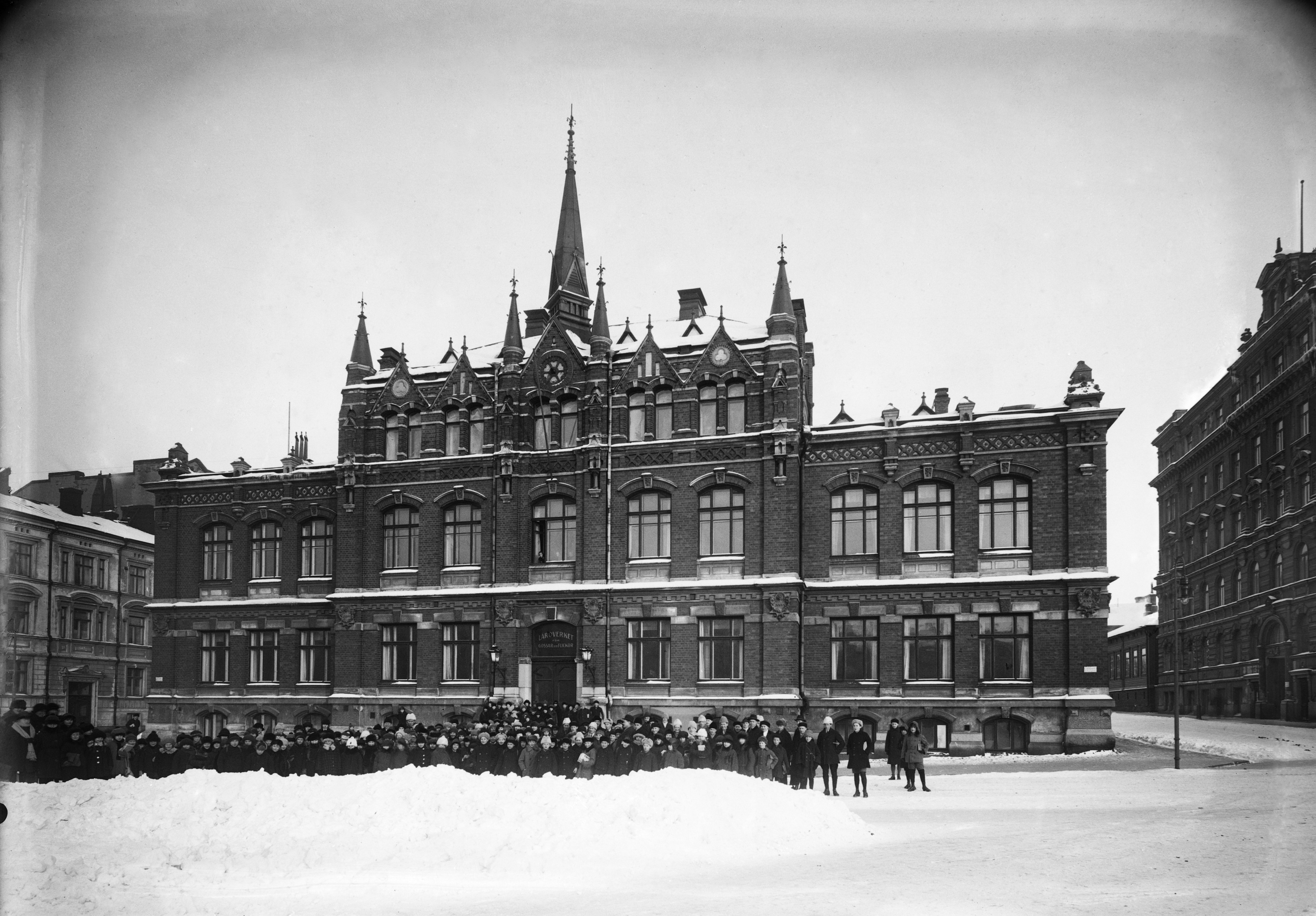

Location
- Helsinki; Finland
- 60°09′47″N 24°56′48″E

Information
- School type: Private, co-educational
- Founded: 1883
- Closed: 1973

Läroverket för gossar och flickor, (English: The educational institution for boys and girls) also known as Brobergska samskolan or Broban, was a Swedish-language school that operated in Helsinki, Finland, from 1883 to 1973. The school was the first co-educational school in Finland. The author and artist Tove Jansson, creator of Moomin, went to Läroverket för gossar och flickor.

== History ==
Läroverket för gossar och flickor was founded in 1883 by Professor Fridolf Gustafsson, assessor Uno Kurtén and assisting professorin Georg Asp. The school was originally called Helsingfors lärovärk för gossar och flickor, but the name was officially changed to Läroverket för gossar och flickor in 1912. Karl Theodor Broberg was headmaster 1883–1900, and the school was unofficially called Brobergska skolan (eng. Broberg's school) or "Broban" after him.

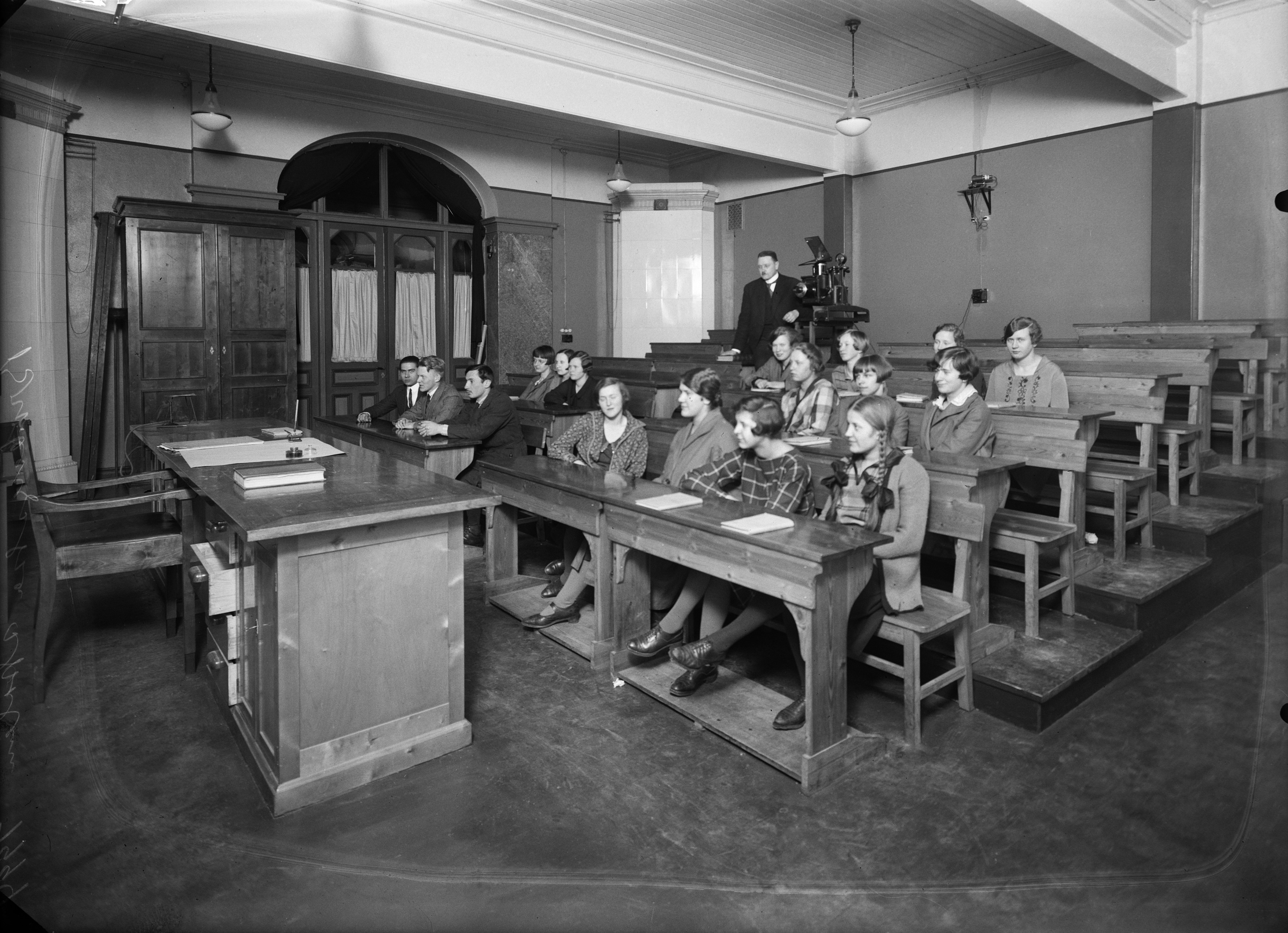
A physics class in 1925

Läroverket för gossar och flickor offered nine educational levels, and from 1889 the students could complete the matriculation examination and thereby qualify for entry into university. The school therefore broke new ground, since this opened the door for girls to graduate and continue their studies at a university. The school followed a curriculum with special emphasis until the Russification of Finland (1899–1905) when all school curricula were aligned.

The school operated at various addresses in central Helsinki until 1895, when it moved in to its own building at Korkeavuorenkatu 23, where the Design Museum is now located.

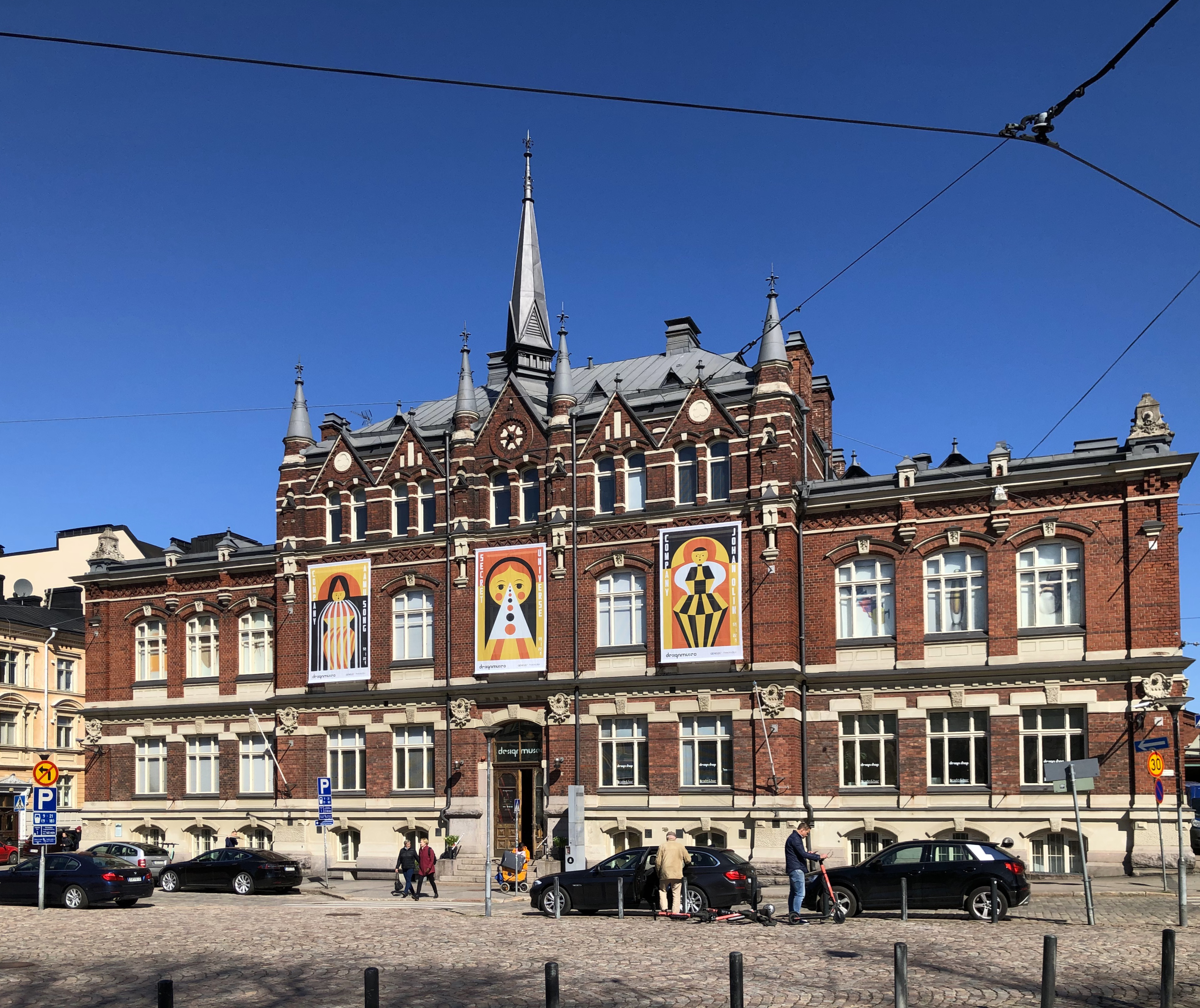
The school building now houses Finland's Design Museum.

In 1973, Läroverket för gossar och flickor merged with Laguska skolan and formed Minervaskolan. In 1975, the new school was merged with Tölö Svenska samskola (Zillen) and closed two years later when the Finnish school system was reformed in 1977. The pupils were moved to Lönnbäckska skolan and Lönnbäckska gymnasiet.

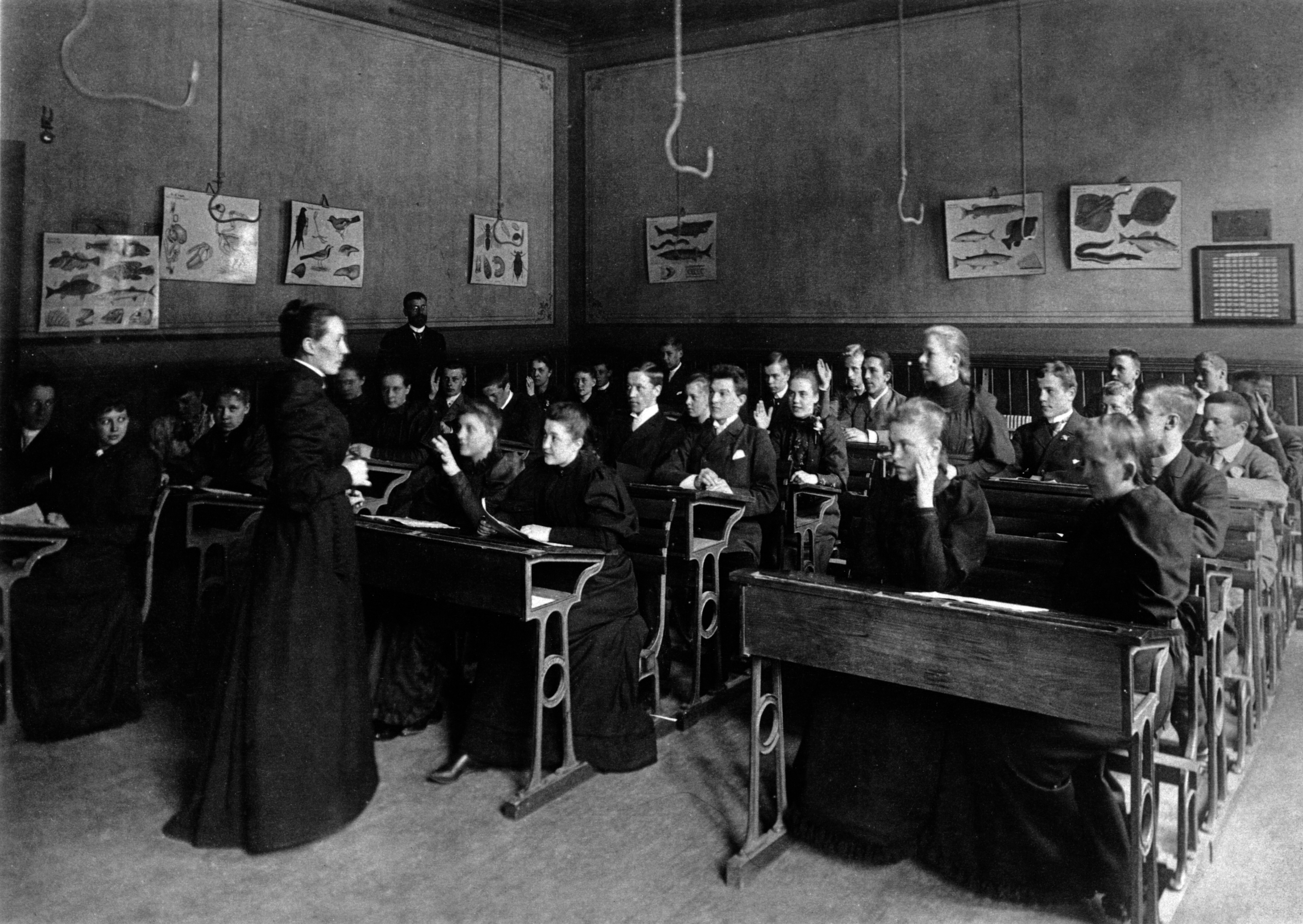
Class in progress in the 1890s

== Famous alumni ==
- Greta Hällfors-Sipilä, artist
- Tove Jansson, author, illustrator, artist
- Viktor Jansson, sculptor
- Ruben Lagus, soldier
- Tor Nessling, industrialist
- Gunnar Nordström, physicist
- Michael Widenius, software programmer

== Headmasters ==
- 1883-1900 Karl Theodor Broberg
- 1900-1905 J.M. Granit
- 1905-1917 Jakob Einar Meinander
- 1917-1925 Rolf Krogerus
- 1925-1944 Fritiof Freudenthal
- 1944-1947 Torsten Steinby
- 1947-1968 Eric W. Nyström
- 1968-1973 Hilding August Karling
- 1973-1977 Margareta Grigorkoff (after the merger with other schools)

== Famous teachers ==
- Annie Edelfelt, Albert Edelfelts sister
