= Eira =

Coordinates: 60°09′23″N 24°56′18″E

Eira Eira
- Helsinki Subdivision
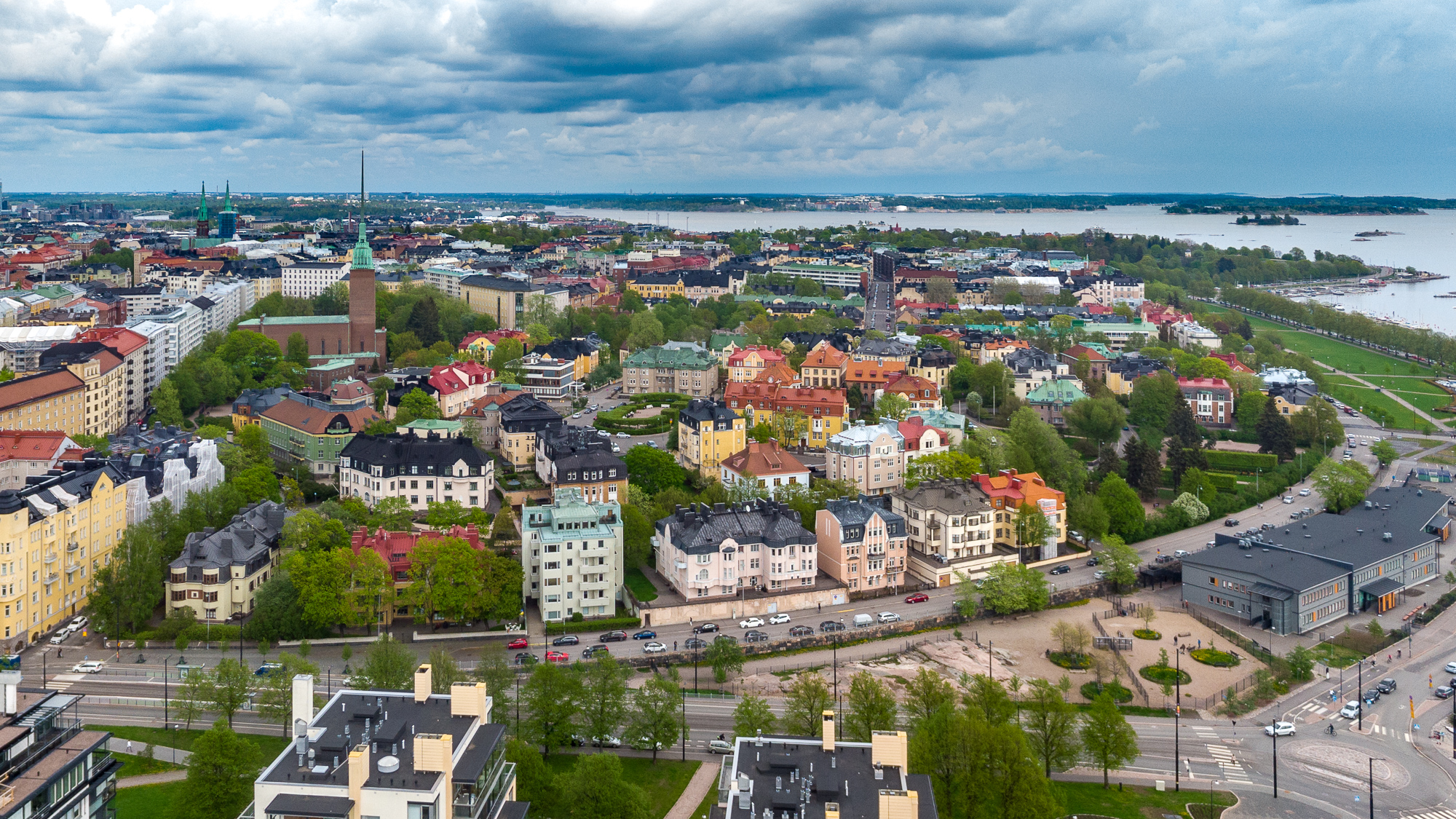

- Position of Eira within Helsinki
- Country: Finland
- Region: Uusimaa
- Sub-region: Greater Helsinki
- Municipality: Helsinki
- District: Southern
- Subdivision regions: none
- Area: 0.19 km^{2} (0.073 sq mi)
- Population (2004): 1,046
  - Density: 6,153/km^{2} (15,940/sq mi)
- Postal codes: 00150
- Subdivision number: 06
- Neighbouring subdivisions: Länsisatama; Punavuori; Ullanlinna

Eira is a borough in Helsinki, the capital of Finland. Eira is located south from the city centre. The neighbourhood has some of the most expensive and sought-after old apartments in Helsinki, built in jugend style. Many foreign embassies and high-class restaurants are situated in Eira and the neighbouring district of Ullanlinna and Kaivopuisto.

== In popular culture ==
Eira also appears in the film Calamari Union directed by Aki Kaurismäki. In the film Eira symbolizes wealth and well-being, which the characters are trying to achieve by moving from Kallio to Eira.

== Notable residents ==
- Juhani Aho, Finnish writer
- Jussi Halla-aho (born 1971), Finnish politician

== Gallery ==
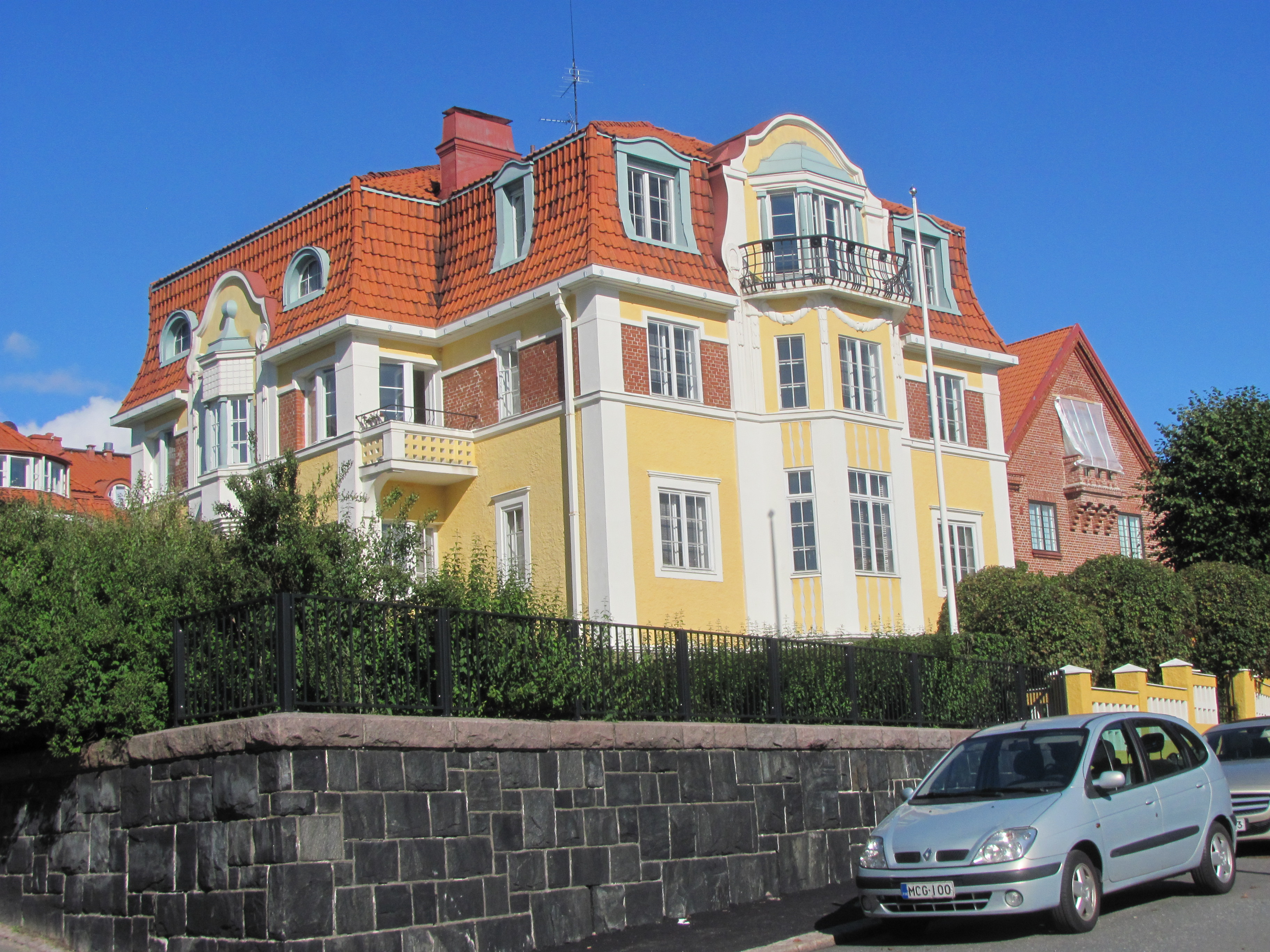

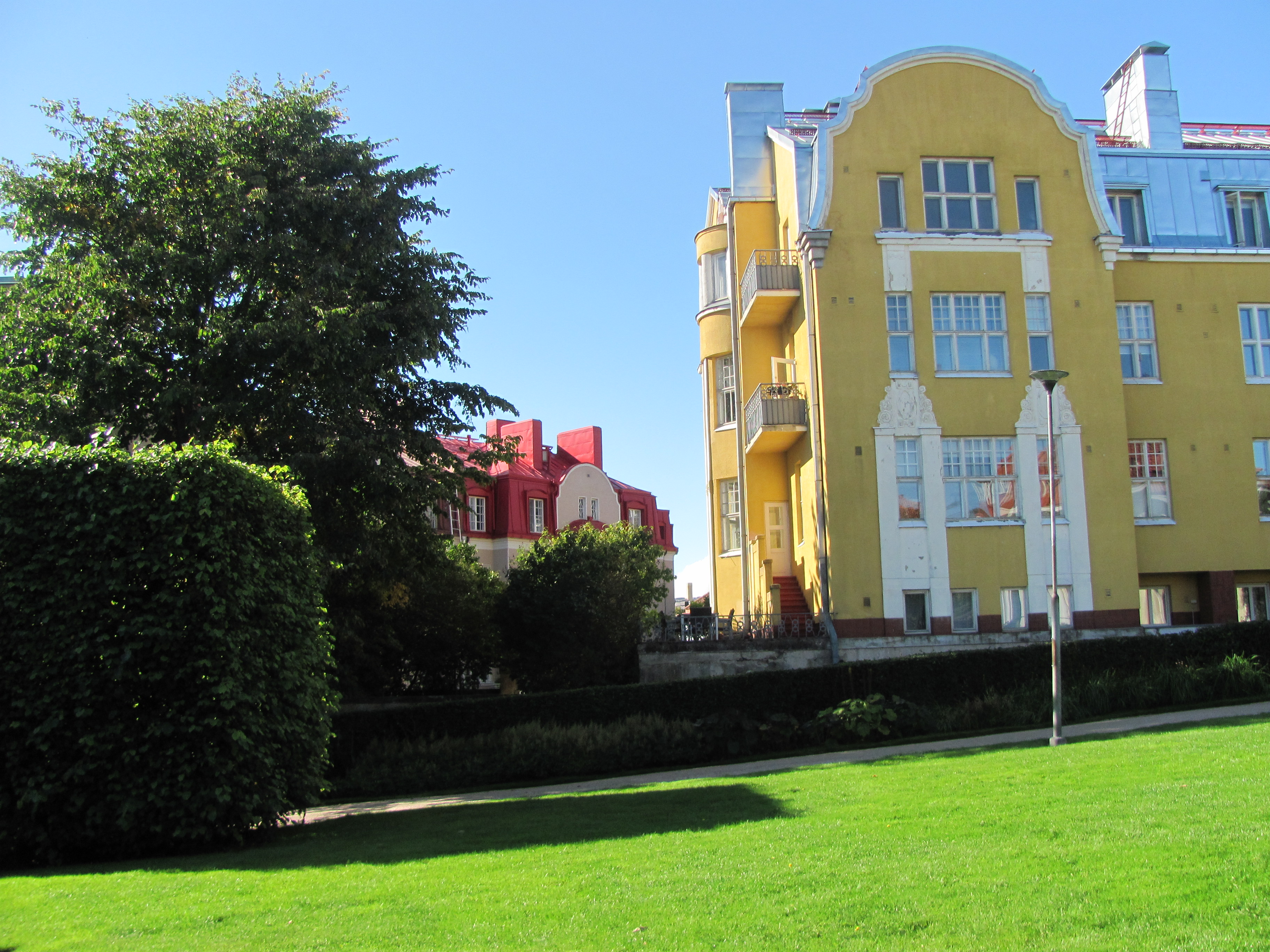

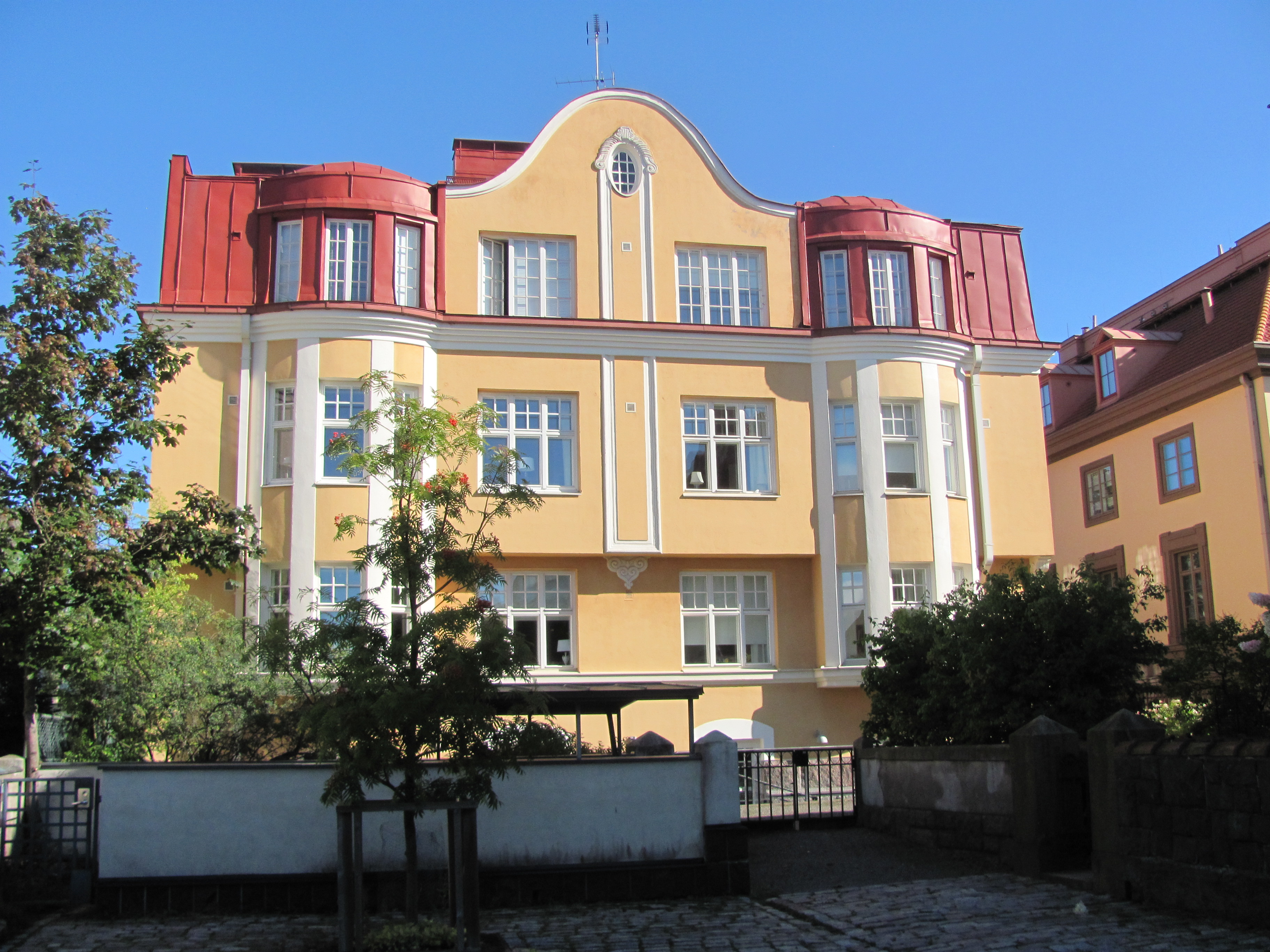

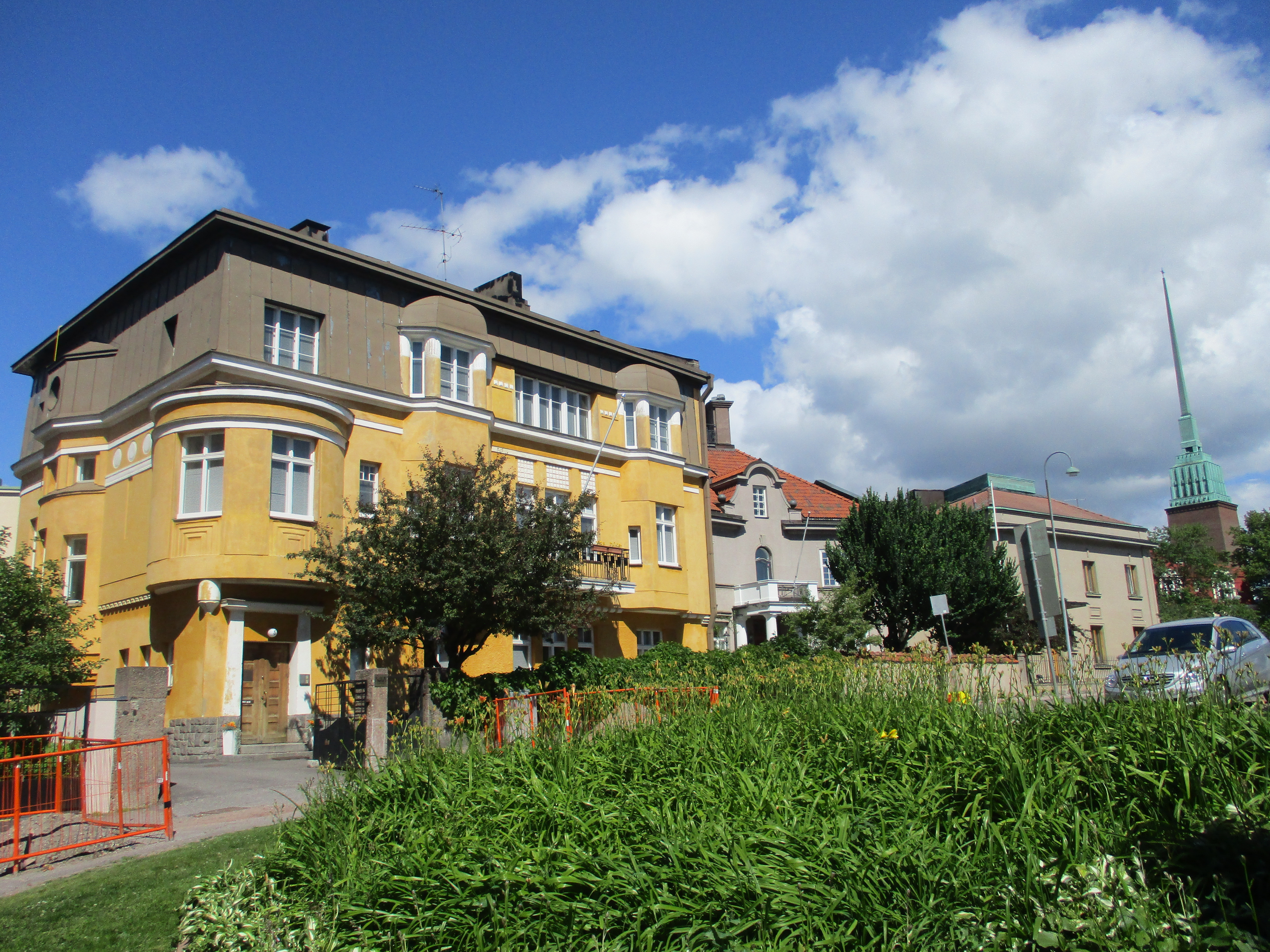

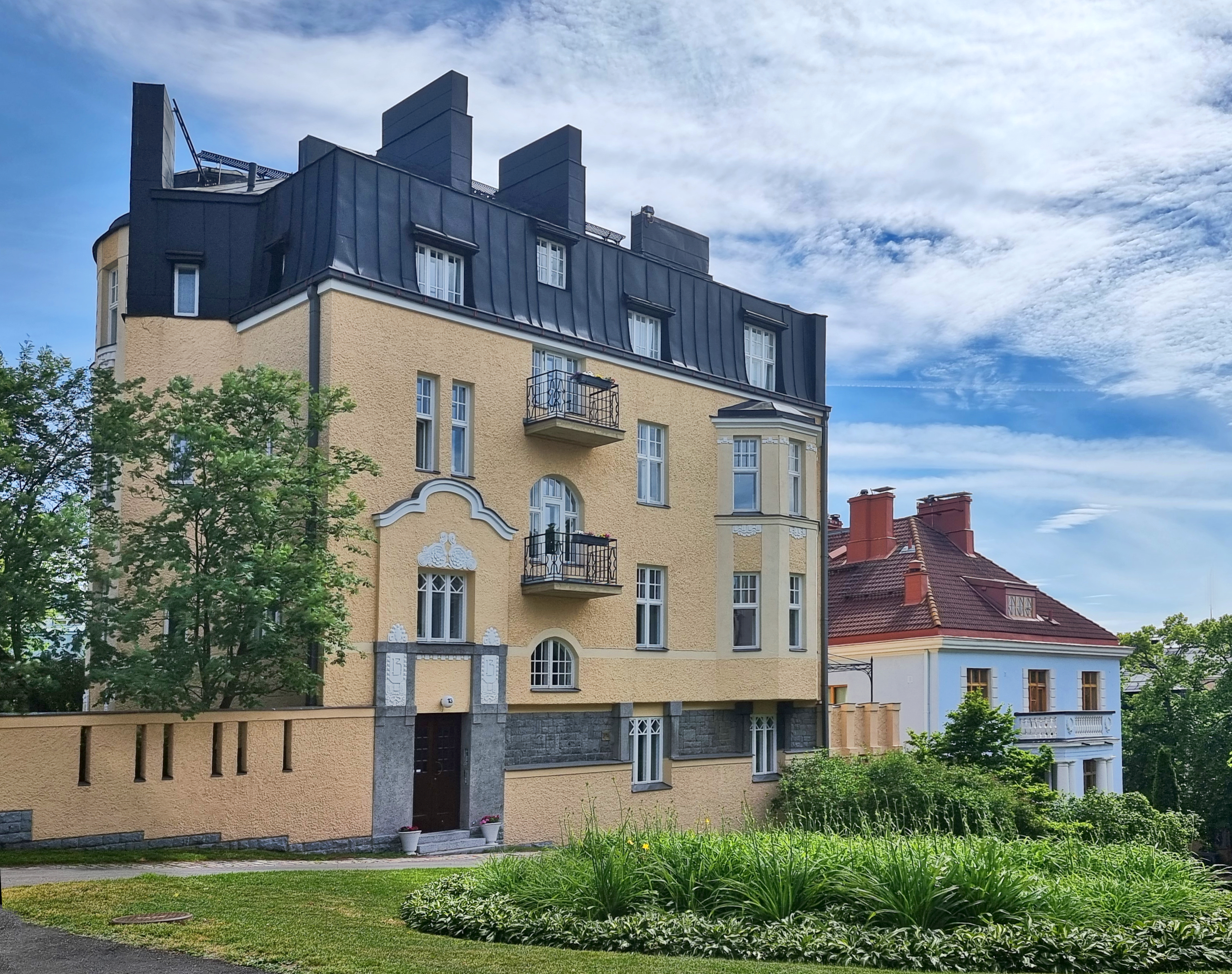

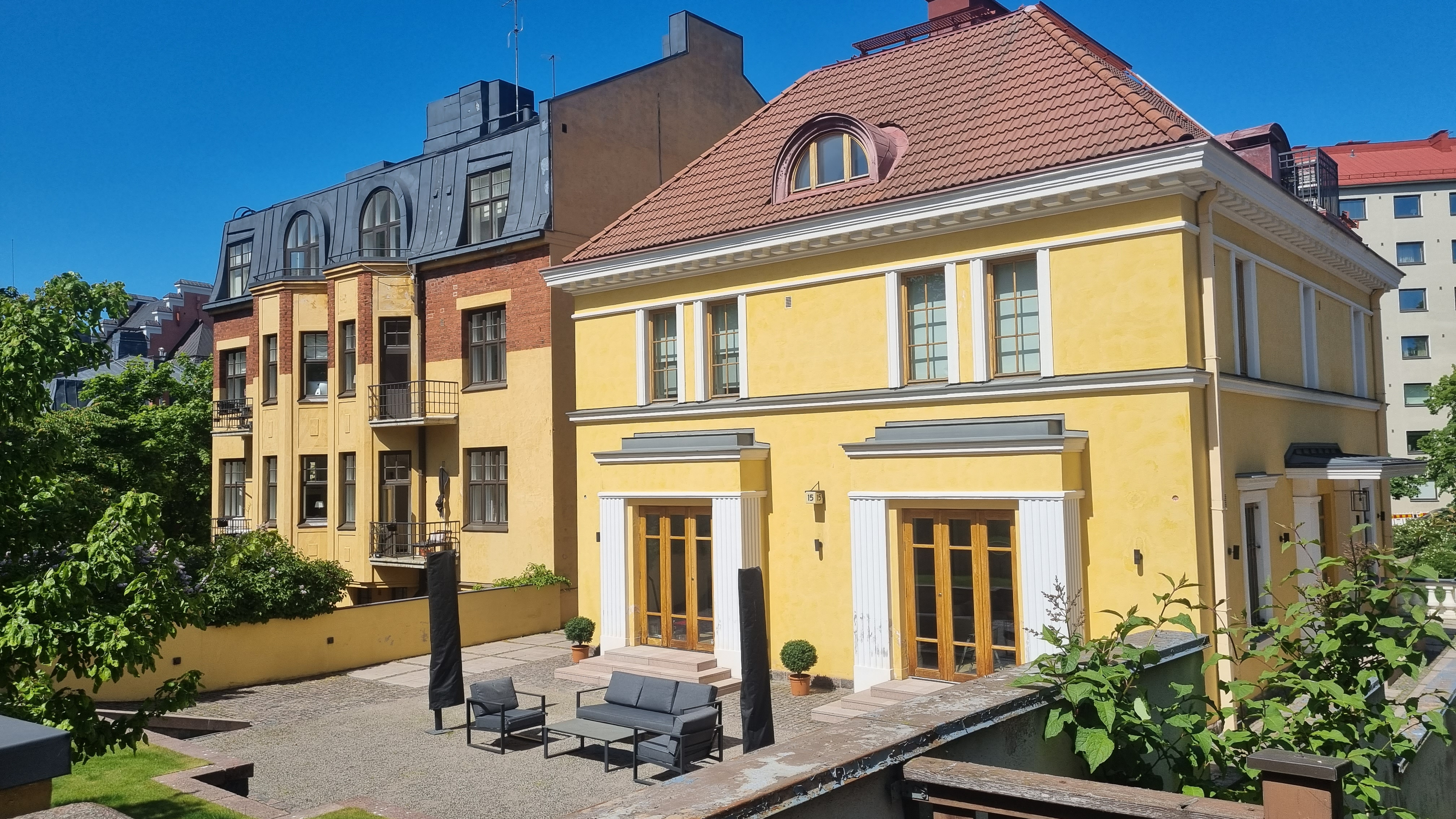

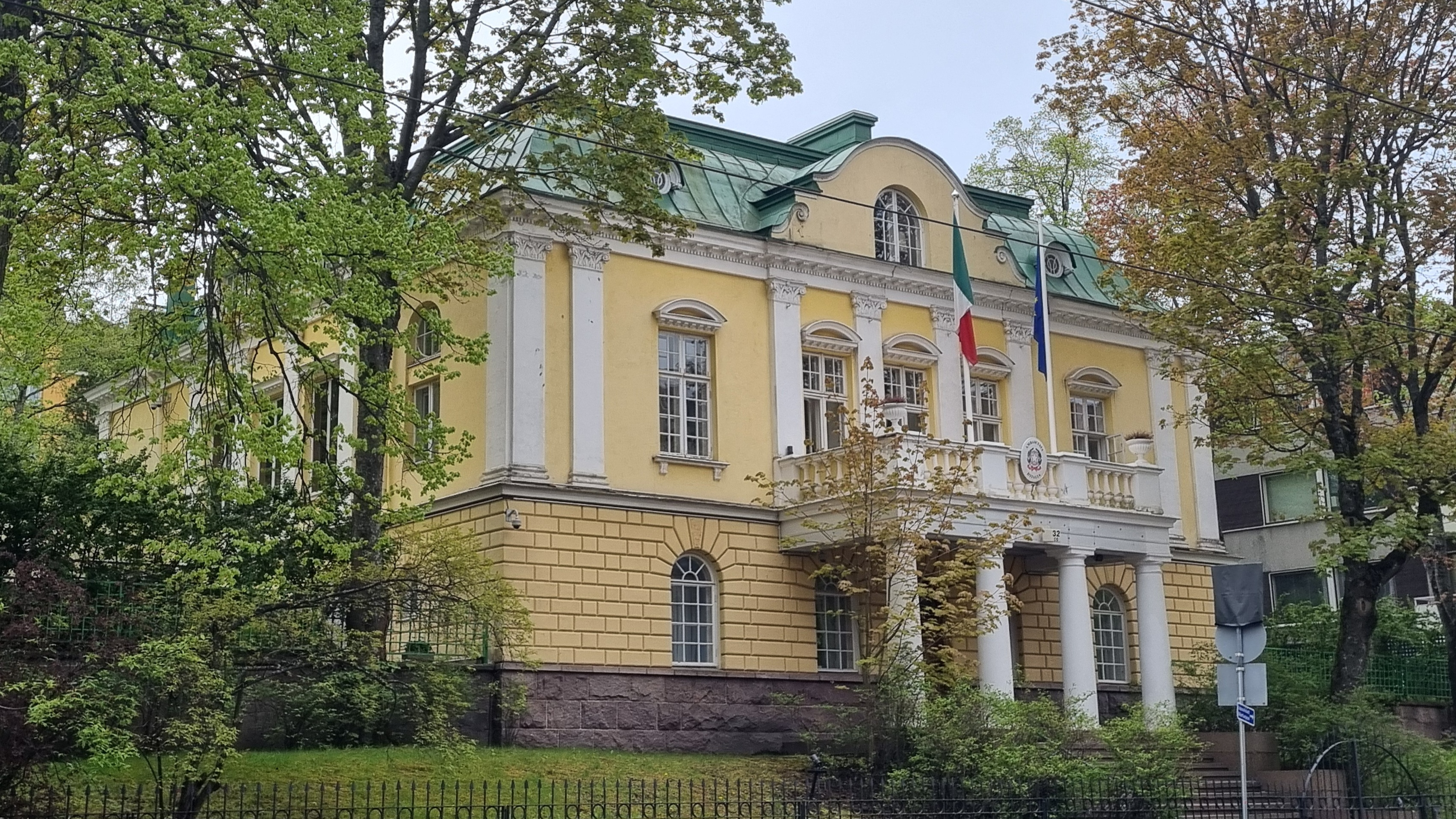
The Residence of the Italian Ambassador to Finland.

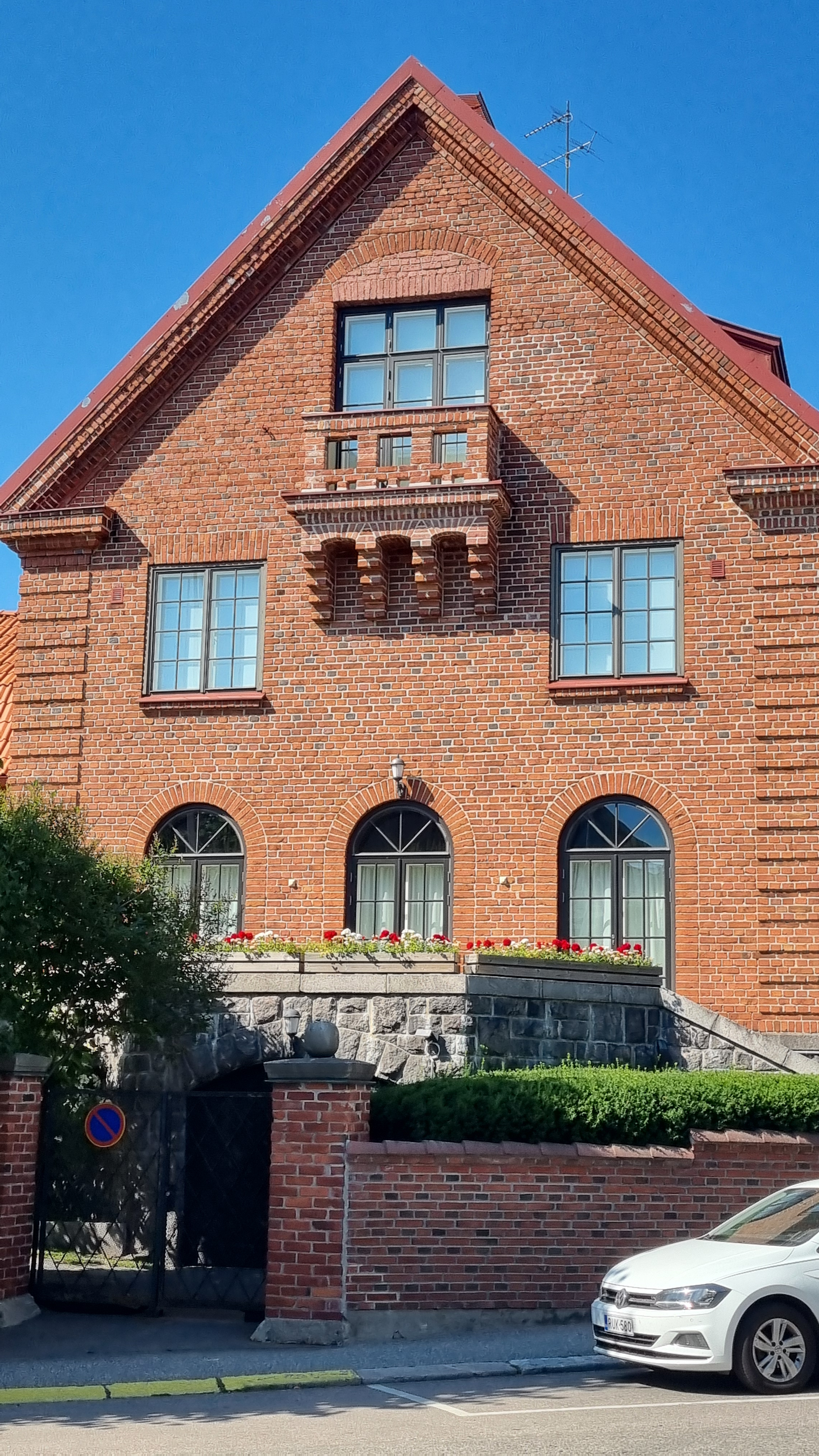

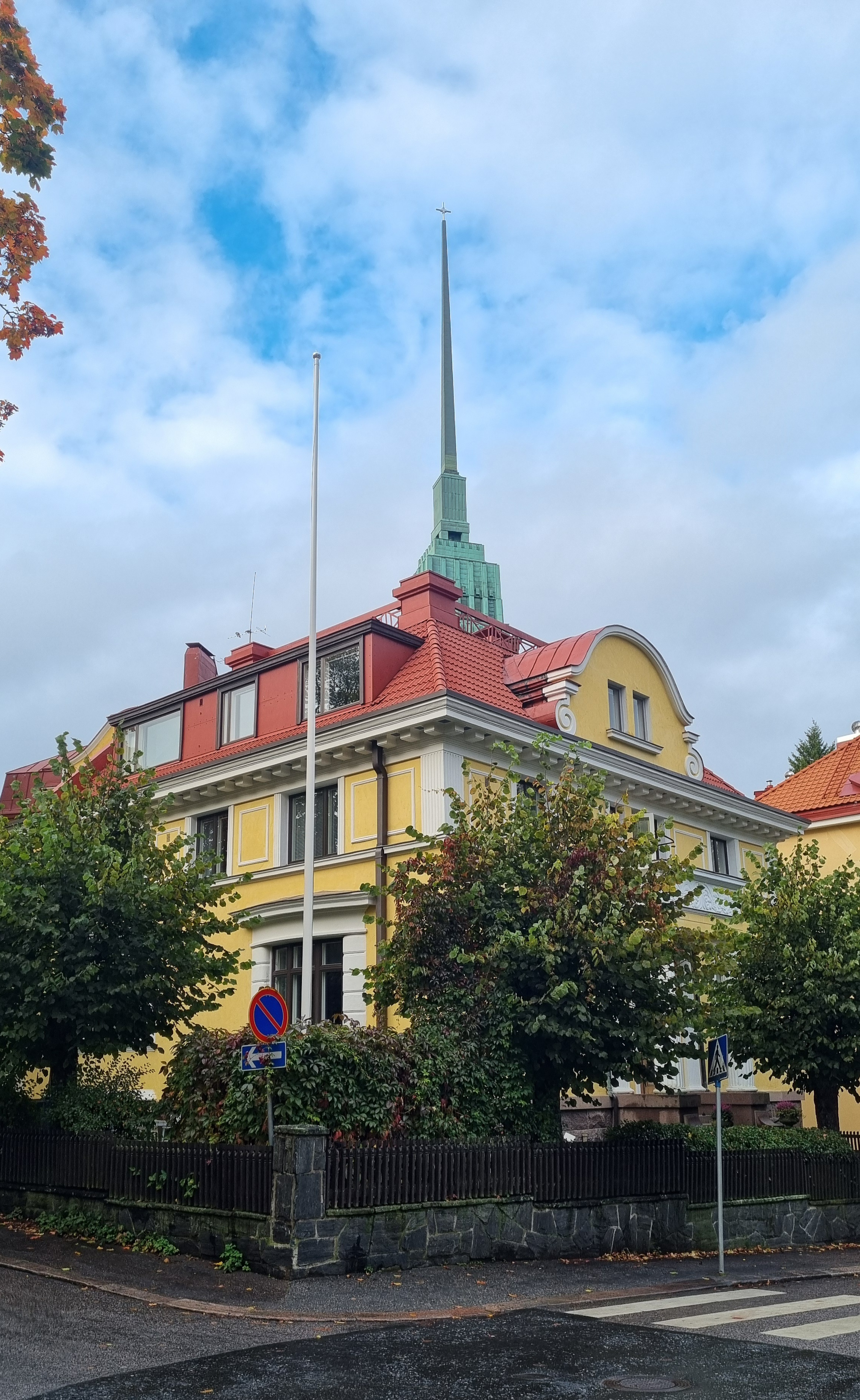

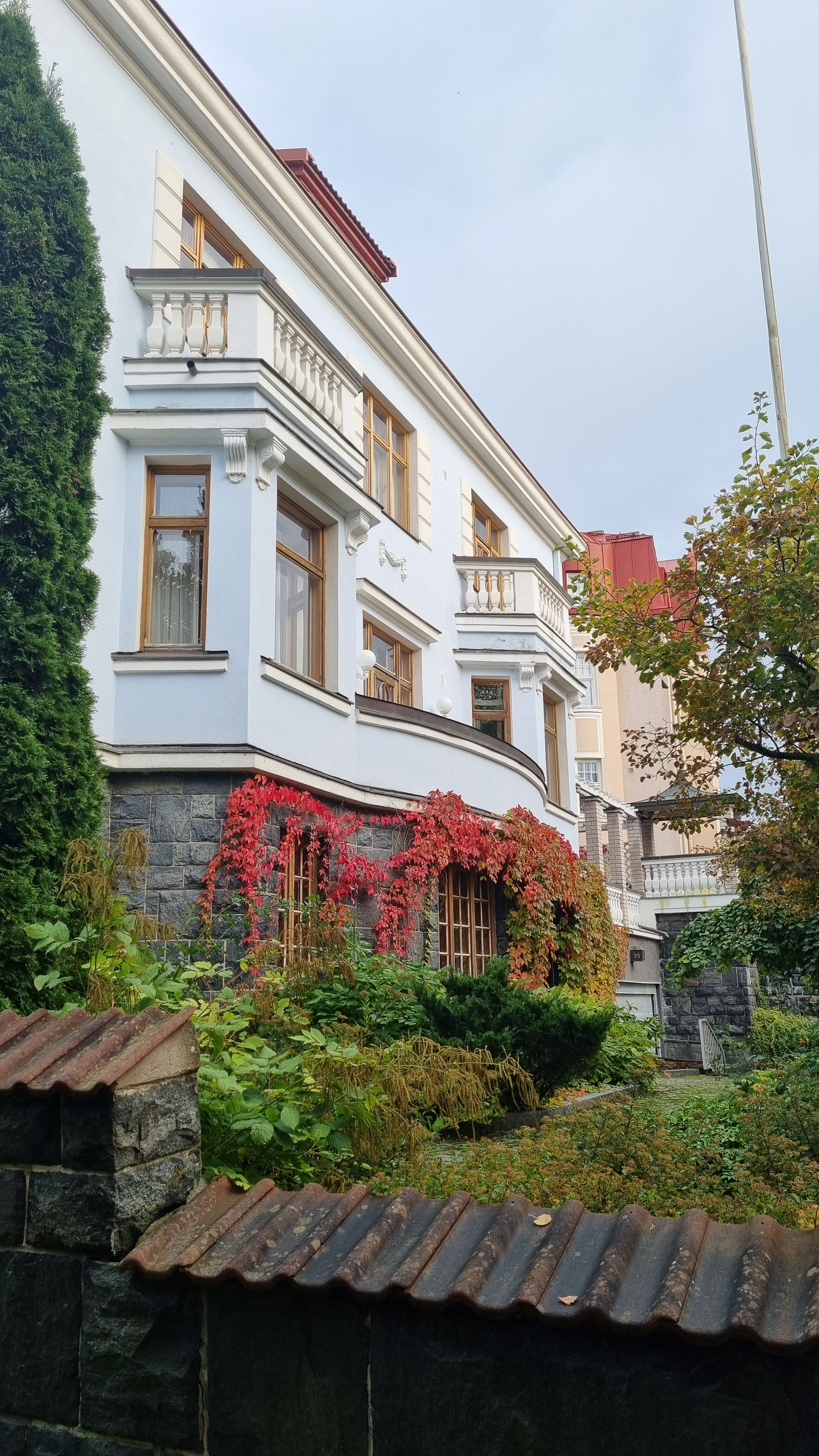

== See also ==
- Ullanlinna
- Kaivopuisto
