= Korkeavuorenkatu =

Street in Helsinki, Finland

Coordinates: 60.163549°N 24.946208°E

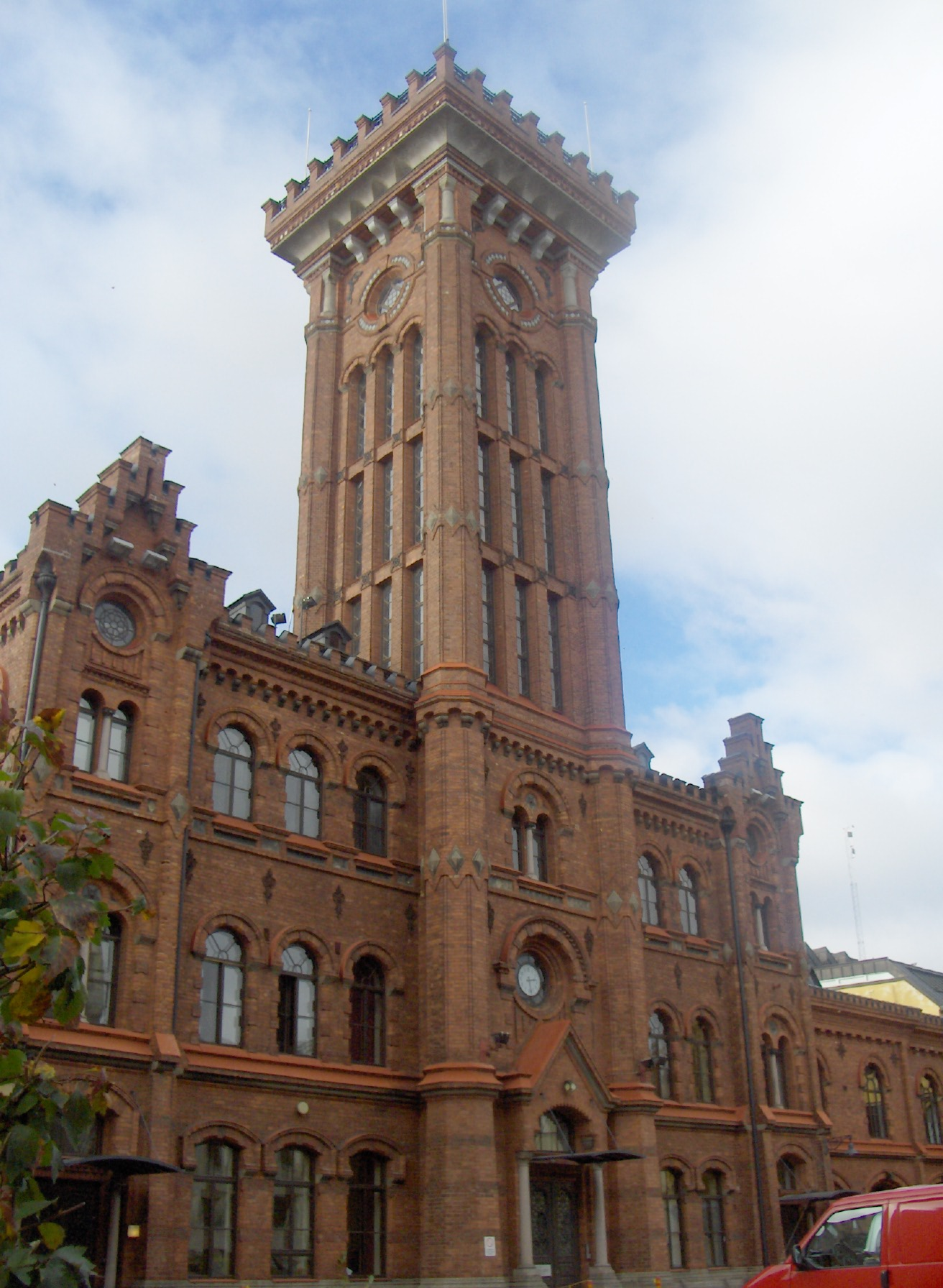
Erottaja Fire Station, Korkeavuorenkatu 26 (built 1891, arch. Theodor Höijer)

Korkeavuorenkatu (Swedish: Högbergsgatan; literal translation, 'street of the high mountain') is a street in Helsinki, Finland. It runs north–south from Etelä-Esplanadi to the junction with Vuorimiehenkatu, where it becomes Kapteeninkatu. Its total length is approximately 860m (2,627 ft). The street is quite hilly, with two peaks, one at Erottaja Fire Station, and the other near the junction with Tarkk'ampujankatu. The section of the street from Etelä-Esplanadi to Yrjönkatu and Punanotkonkatu belongs to the Kaartinkaupunki district, and the rest to Ullanlinna. The houses are numbered from south to north, with odd numbers on the right and even on the left, facing north.

== Notable buildings ==
- Erottaja Fire Station, number 26
- St John's Church, number 12
- Helsinki Design Museum, number 23
