= Greta Hällfors-Sipilä =

Finnish painter (1899–1974)

Greta Olga Hällfors-Sipilä
- Born: 1899; Helsinki
- Died: 1974; Kellokoski

Greta Olga Hällfors-Sipilä (1899–1974) was a Finnish painter. She participated enthusiastically in the new trends which reached Finland's art scene in the early 20th century, embracing Impressionism, Functionalism and Cubism.

== Biography ==
Born in Helsinki on 19 February 1899, Hällfors-Sipilä first studied at Läroverket för gossar och flickor and after graduating at the Finnish Art Society's Drawing School from 1915 to 1917. Despite the First World War, there were several international exhibitions in Helsinki presenting Impressionist and Cubist works. Participants included painters from the German group Der Blaue Reiter, the Swedes Isaac Grünewald and Sigrid Hjertén, and the Russian Wassily Kandinsky, all of whom thrilled Hällfors-Sipilä with their free touch and bright colours. She embarked on paintings of urban life, opting for the abstraction and simplification of her subjects. The influence of Matisse and Chagall can also be seen in some of her works, especially those depicting dancers or musicians.

Hällfors-Sipilä was passionately fond of music. A competent pianist, she studied at the Helsinki Music Institute from the 1910s to the 1930s, developing a common interest in Modernism with her friend Sulho Sipilä (1895–1949) whom she had met at art school when she was 16. They married in 1924. Adopting the nicknames Tiva and Halle, they lived in the centre of Helsinki near St. John's Church which they both often depicted in their paintings.

From 1917, Hällfors-Sipilä frequently exhibited in Finland and abroad although her husband's work generally received more attention than hers. As a woman, she was never able to arrange a solo exhibition although on one occasion she exhibited together with her husband. After years of loneliness while her husband served in the navy, she became mentally ill and from 1946 was committed to a mental hospital. She died on 24 April 1974 in Kellokoski.
