= Architecture & Design Museum, Helsinki =

Museum in Helsinki, Finland

Architecture & Design Museum (AD Museum)
- Arkkitehtuuri- ja designmuseo (AD-museo)
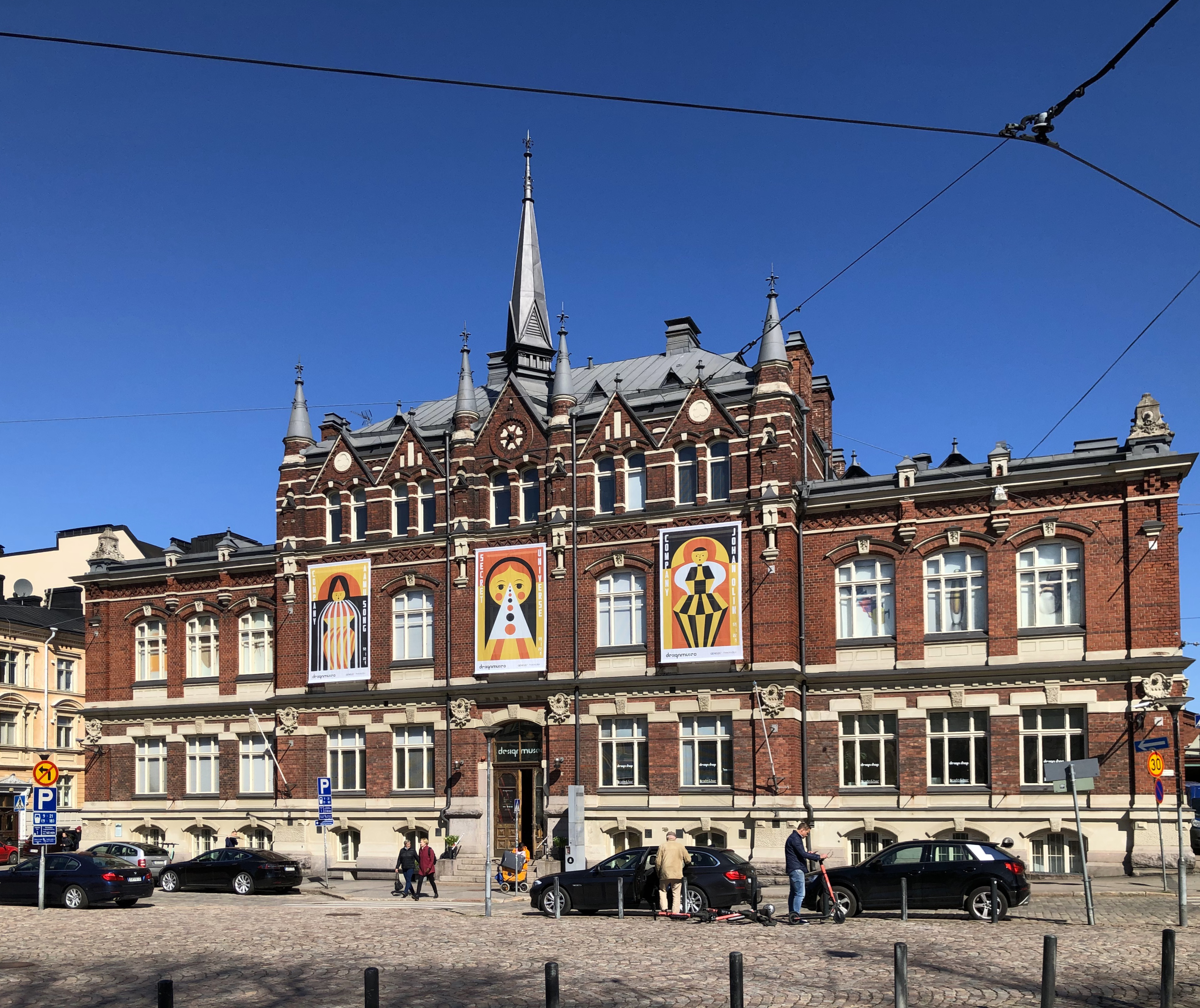
- Architecture & Design Museum in Helsinki
- Former names: Museum of Applied Arts (Taideteollisuusmuseo); Design Museum (Designmuseo)
- Established: 1873; 153 years ago
- Location: Helsinki, Finland
- Coordinates: 60°09′47″N 024°56′47″E
- Type: Architecture and design museum
- Website: admuseo.fi

The Architecture & Design Museum (also known as the AD Museum; formerly the Design Museum and the Museum of Applied Arts) (Note: Finnish: Arkkitehtuuri- ja designmuseo; also known as the AD Museum (Finnish: AD-museo); formerly known as the Design Museum (Finnish: Designmuseo, Swedish: Designmuseet) and the Museum of Applied Arts (Finnish: Taideteollisuusmuseo)) is a museum in Helsinki devoted to the exhibition of both Finnish and foreign design and architecture, including industrial design, fashion, and graphic design. The building is situated in Kaartinkaupunki, on Korkeavuorenkatu Street, and is owned by the Republic of Finland through Senate Properties. The building was completed in 1895 and originally built as a school building for the Swedish-language school Läroverket för gossar och flickor.

The museum, which is 152–153 years old (2026) and one of the oldest in the world – was first founded in 1873 but has operated in its present premises, a former school, designed by architect Gustaf Nyström in 1894 in the neo-Gothic style, since 1978. In 2002, the museum changed its name from Taideteollisuusmuseo (Museum of Applied Arts) to Designmuseo (Design Museum) because the original name was too long and complicated. The Museum of Finnish Architecture was located on the same city block until the Design Museum merged with it to form the Architecture & Design Museum in 2024.

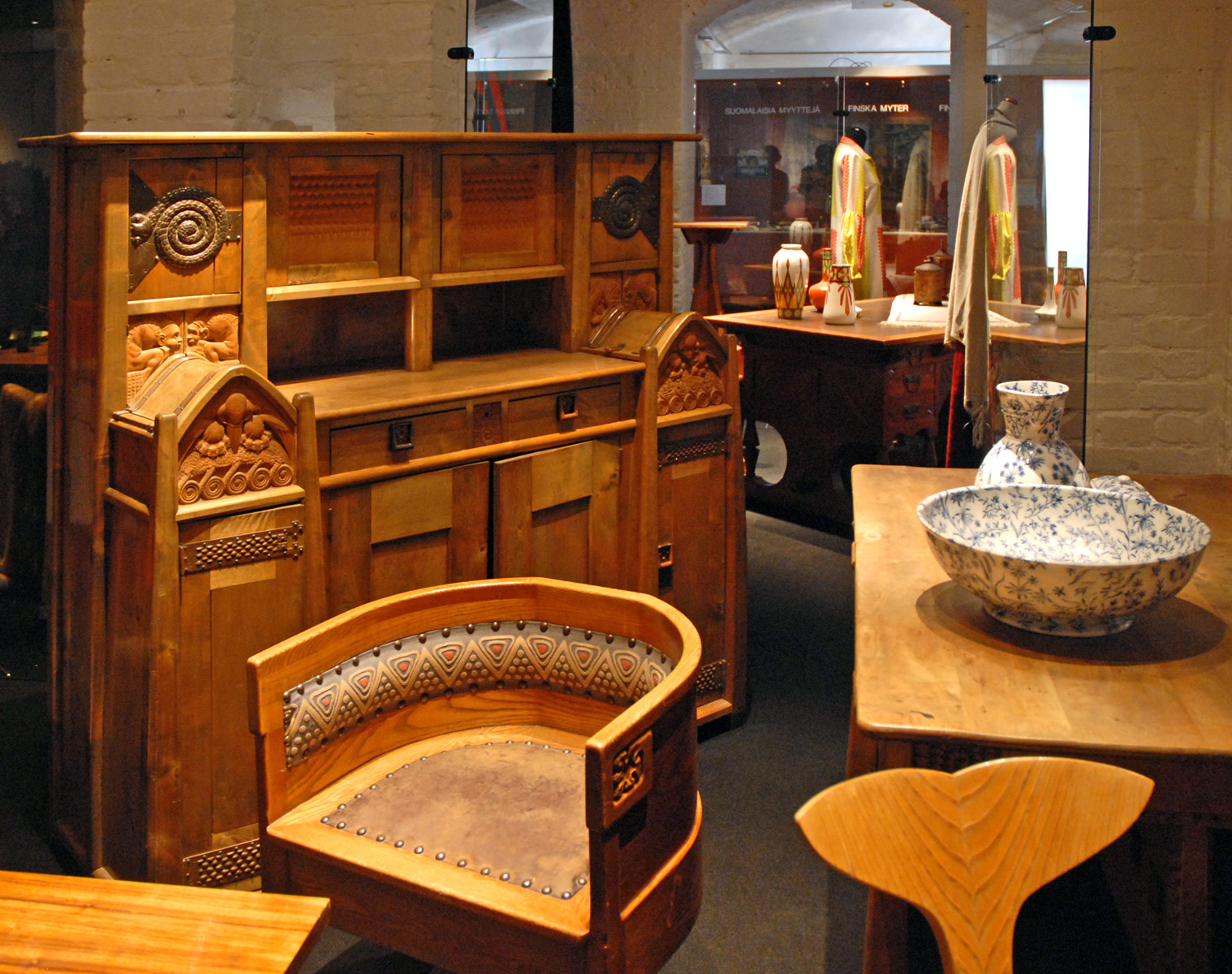
Furniture of the Finnish Art Nouveau style (1903)

The museum includes a permanent exhibition devoted to the history of Finnish design from 1870 to the present day, as well as space for changing exhibitions. The museum's permanent collection consists of over 75,000 objects, 40,000 drawings and 100,000 drawings. The Architecture & Design Museum arranges also international touring exhibitions and publishes books and exhibition catalogues. From museum's home page, there is a free access to several web exhibitions on Finnish design, for example about the production of Arabia factory, Marimekko and designers Kaj Franck and Oiva Toikka. The latest web exhibition is about 1950–1960s design – an iconic golden era of Finnish design. The museum also has a cafe and shop.

== See also ==
- List of design museums
