= Punavuori =

Coordinates: 60°09′42″N 024°56′17″E

Punavuori Rödbergen
- Subdivision
- Position of Punavuori within Helsinki
- Country: Finland
- Region: Uusimaa
- Sub-region: Greater Helsinki
- Municipality: Helsinki
- District: Southern
- Subdivision regions: none
- Area: 0.42 km^{2} (0.16 sq mi)
- Population (2010): 8,440
  - Density: 20,095/km^{2} (52,050/sq mi)
- Postal codes: 00120, 00150
- Subdivision number: 05
- Neighbouring subdivisions: Kaartinkaupunki; Kamppi; Eira; Ullanlinna; Munkkisaari

Punavuori (Finnish: [ˈpunɑˌʋuo̯ri]; Swedish: Rödbergen) is a neighbourhood in the center of Helsinki, the capital of Finland. The name Punavuori (lit. 'red mountain') refers to red cliffs located between Sepänkatu and Punavuorenkatu. They were still visible in the 19th century, nowadays they are covered with buildings and pavement. Punavuori was traditionally a working-class neighbourhood, today it is known as a bohemian district popular among artists, students and hipsters. It is one of the most densely populated areas in Finland.

After the new location and growth of Helsinki in the 18th century, Punavuori became the area next to the center. During the 19th century the district had a seedy reputation. Most of the brothels and beerhouses were found in Punavuori. The social problems were aggravated by quickly built rent-apartments for the poor.

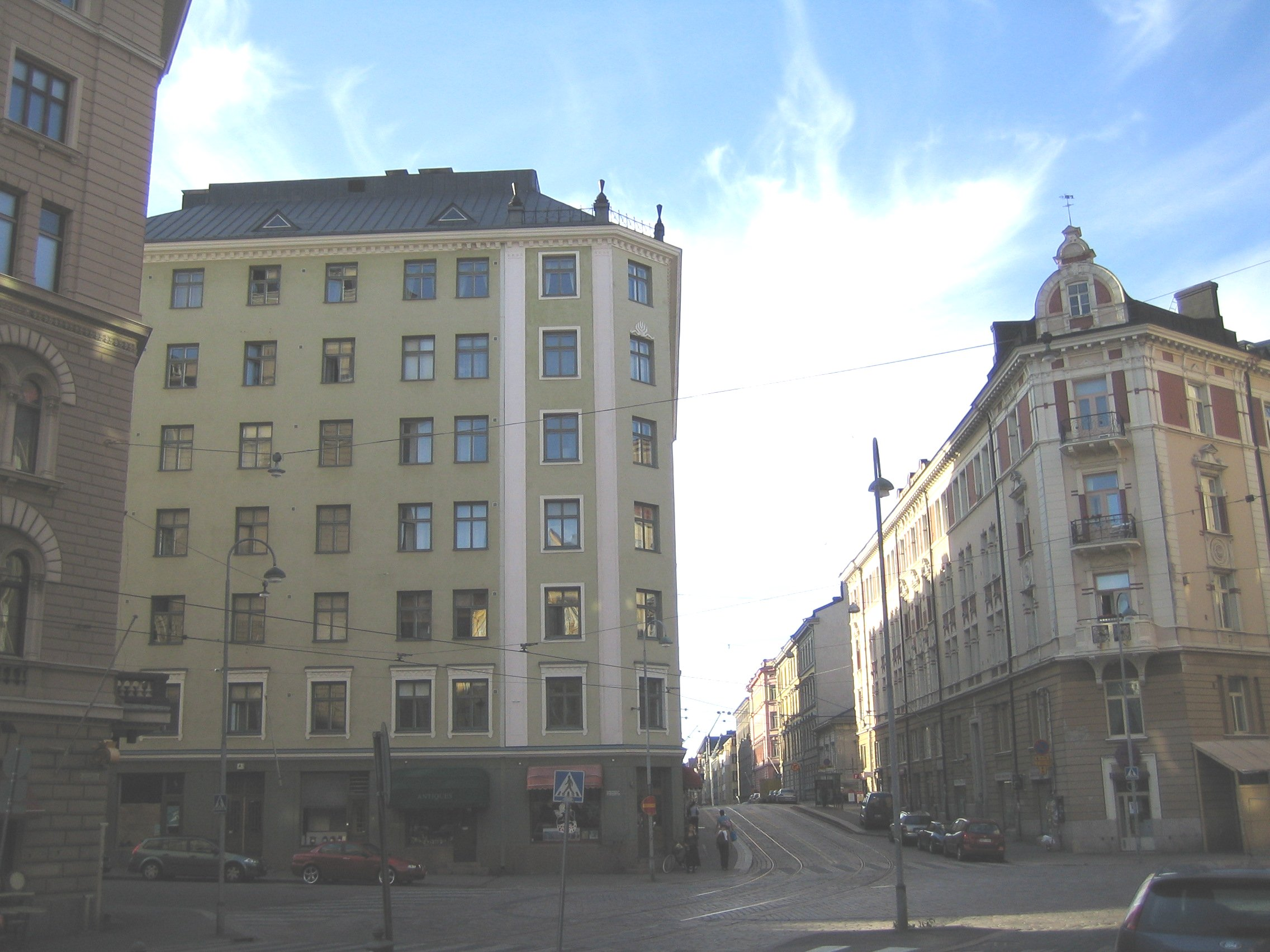
Viiskulma ("five corner") intersection in Punavuori

After World War II, the district went through a process of gentrification. Today Punavuori offers many trendy small shops and bars, nightclubs and restaurants. Important streets include Uudenmaankatu and Iso Roobertinkatu. In the old Helsinki slang, the district is called "Rööperi" (derived from the district's Swedish name).

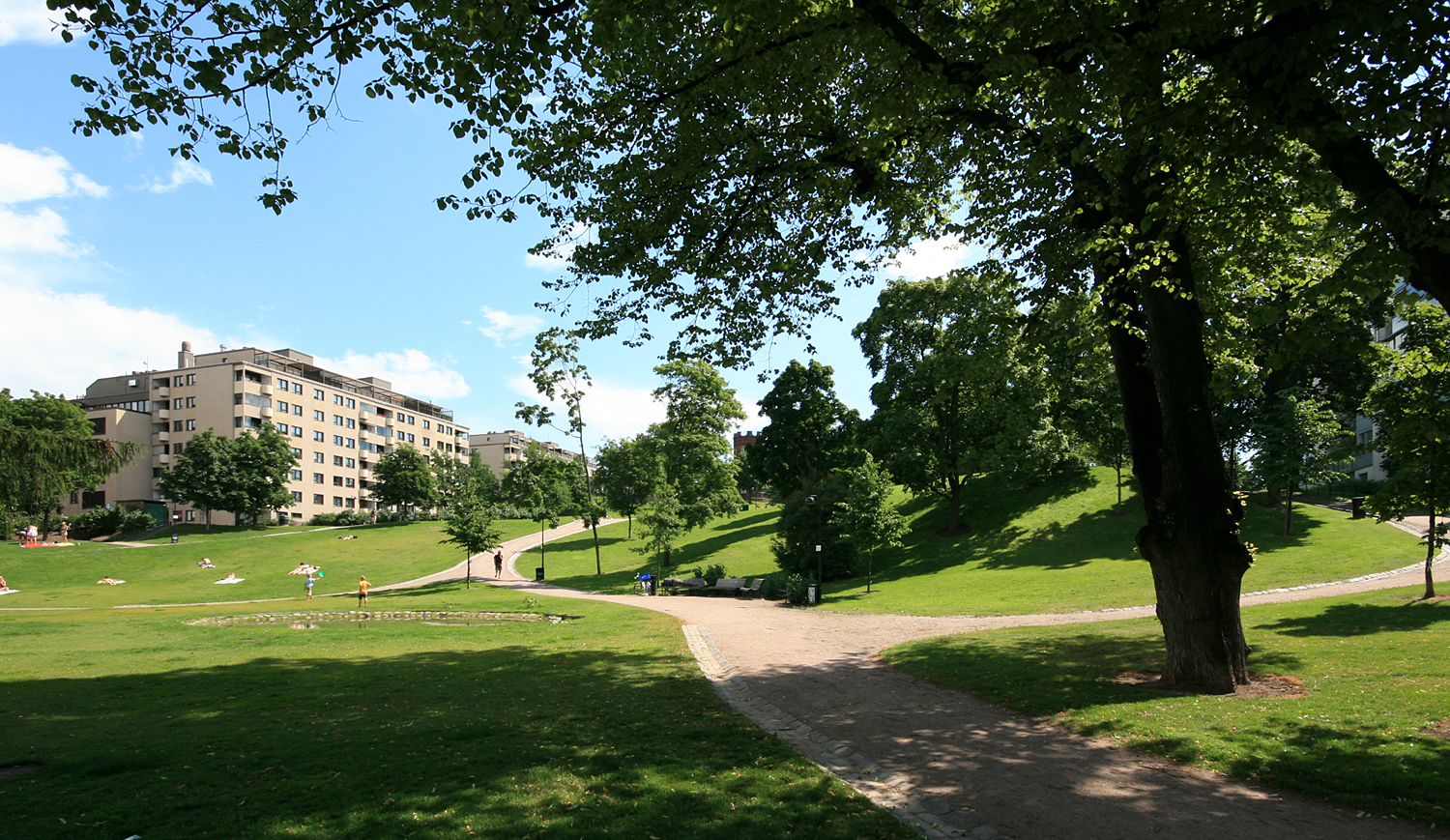
Sinebrychoff park in Punavuori

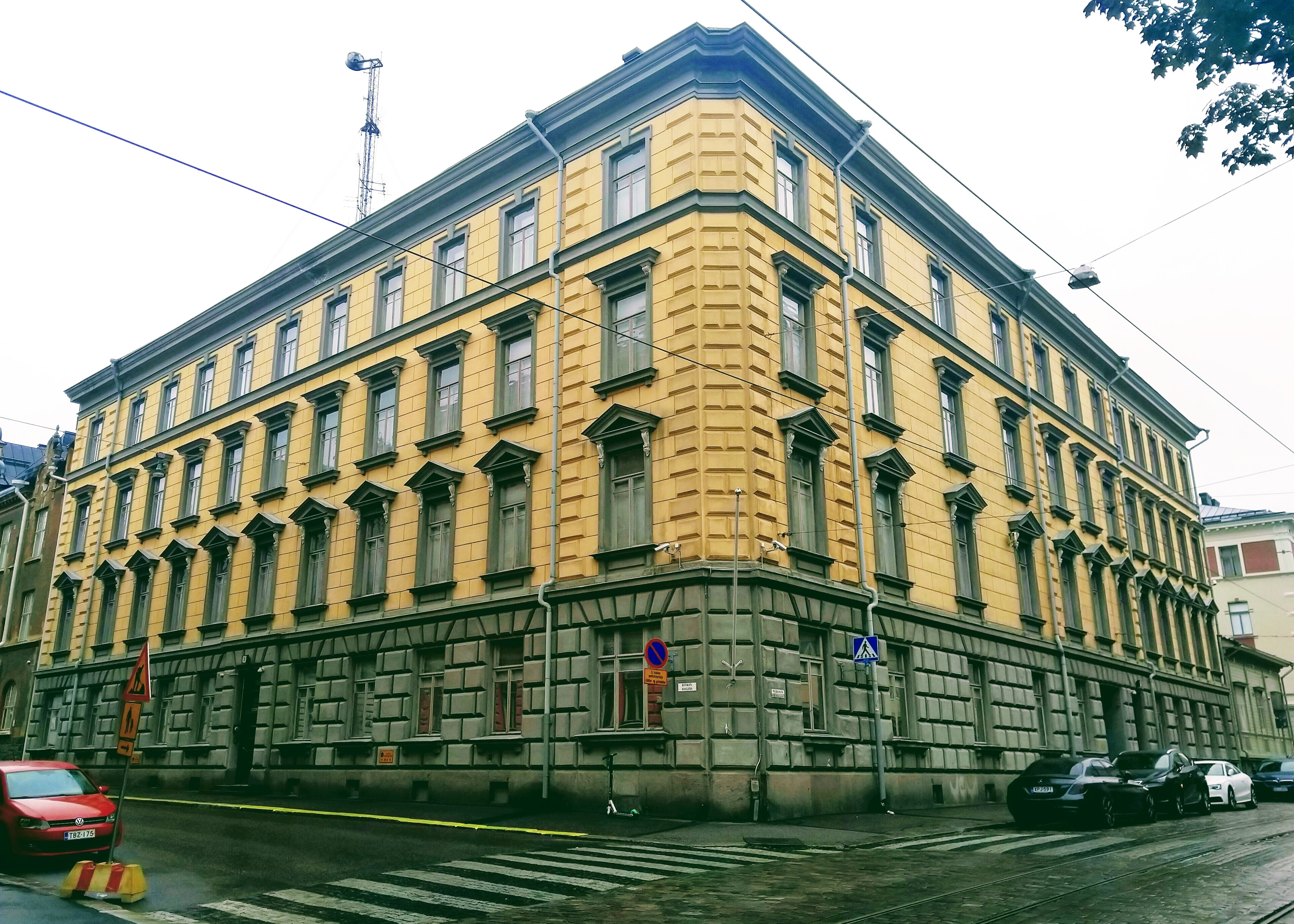
The former headquarters of the Finnish Security Intelligence Service or SUPO in Punavuori

== In popular culture ==
A Finnish cover version of The Beatles' song "Penny Lane" has lyrics referring to Punavuori. The song is called "Rööperiin" which means "To Punavuori", using the slang term derived from the Swedish name. The song has been recorded by Pepe Willberg (and later by other artists). The lyrics for the chorus part are: "Rööperiin, mä kaipaan niin" ("I yearn for Punavuori").

== Art galleries ==
Punavuori is located within the trendy Design District of Helsinki, an area with a large concentration of museums, art galleries, local design shops, antique markets, theatres, and other landmarks within the art and design scene.

Even though Punavuori area consists of only 13 streets and its total area is about 42 ha, there are many art galleries in the neighborhood, plus many design shops and trendy cafes, bars, and restaurants. Galleries in the area include: Art Salon Piirto, Atelier Matti Pikkujämsä, Bukowskis (design auction market), Exhibition Laboratory, Galleria Artika, Galleria Kajaste, Galleria Mafka & Alakoski, Galleria Sinne, Helsinki Contemporary, Life Art, Photographic Gallery Hippolyte and Rööperin taidesalonki.

== See also ==
- Kamppi
- Fredrikinkatu
