= Tellervo =

Finnish goddess of forests

- Maiden of Tapio
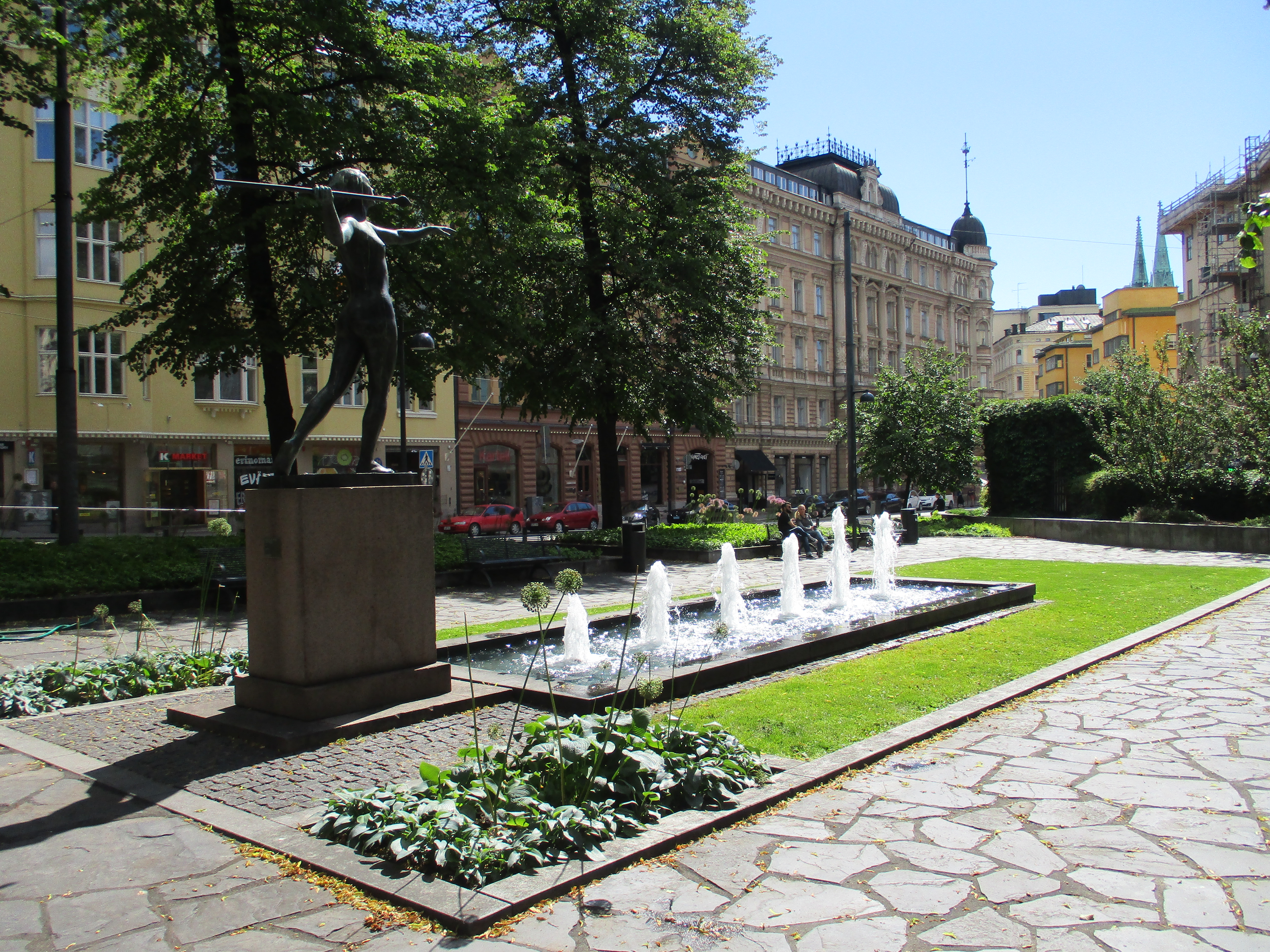
- A statue of Tellervo in Kolmikulma Park by Yrjö Liipola, 1928
- Other names: Kainuu: Tillervo; Karelia: Killervö, Tellervö, Tillervo; Ostrobothnia: Hillervo?
- Gender: Female
- Ethnic group: Finns, Karelians

Genealogy
- Parents: Tapio (father); Mielikki (mother)

Tellervo (Finnish pronunciation: [ˈtelːerʋo]) is the Finnish goddess of forests. She is the daughter of Tapio, the King of the Forest.

Mentions of Tellervo in runic songs are limited to Kainuu, North Karelia, the Karelian Isthmus and White Karelia. In Kainuu and White Karelia, Tellervo is asked to help with hunting a bear; in North Karelia, to find help against an illness that came from the forest; on the Karelian Isthmus, to protect cattle.

It has been suggested that the Tellervo name is a variant of Hillervo, Mother of Otters, mentioned in one runic song. This view has been supported by e.g. M.A. Castrén and Martti Haavio.

== Name ==
The name Tellervo has been theorized to originate from Pellervo, associated with an agricultural god. The name would have morphed into Tellervo in order to share alliteration with Tapio, the epithet developing from poika ('son') to paimen ('shepherd') to tytär ('daughter'), as explained by Kaarle Krohn. Jacob Grimm suggested the name to come from telta, tellan 'tegmen'. M.A. Castrén believed the name Tellervo to have developed from earlier Hillervo. One White Karelian poem also mentions "Killervö, Maiden of Tapio", which Martti Haavio connected to Hillervo and Tellervo as well, suggesting that the original name could have been Killervo after killeri 'trap'. However, Haavio believed it more likely that Hillervo came from hilleri 'polecat'. He considered Castrén's Tellervo–Hillervo connection the best explanation, as Tellervo's name also appears in the forms Tillervo and Tellervö.

== Hillervo, Mother of Otters ==
Hillervo was first mentioned by Christfried Ganander in 1786. He called Hillervo an otter goddess, the Mother of Otters. This name, Hillervo, only appears in one collected runic song, and the same song mentions Juoletar, a beautiful man and, according to Ganander, Hillervo's husband and the Finnish Neptune. However, Juoletar is an explicitly feminine name with the final suffix -tar. According to Haavio's theory, Hillervo was originally the Mother of Polecats, but as polecats only lived in Finland between the 13th and 17th centuries before returning in the 20th century, Hillervo in songs was originally for polecat hunting spells, only later being reutilized in otter hunting spells after polecats had disappeared. Therefore, Juoletar would be the original Mother of Otters, or the Elder of Otters (whether the rune singer referred to Juoletar as a mistress or a king).

== Epithets ==
Epithet	Epithet meaning	Regions
Tellervo, Tapion neiti Tellervo, Tapion neito Tillervo, Tapion neiti Tellervö, Tapion neiti Killervö, Tapion neito	'Tellervo, Maiden of Tapio'	Kainuu, Karelian Isthmus, North Karelia, White Karelia
Tellervo, Tapion paimen	'Tellervo, Shepherd of Tapio'	White Karelia
Hillervo, oma emuu	'Hillervo, mother of one's own'	Ostrobothnia, unknown
Hillervo, hyvä emäntä	'Hillervo, good mistress'	Ostrobothnia, unknown
(About Hillervo:) Vejen ehtosa emäntä	'generous mistress of water'	Ostrobothnia, unknown
