= Ullanlinna =

Coordinates: 60°09′30″N 024°56′50″E

Ullanlinna Ulrikasborg
- Helsinki Subdivision
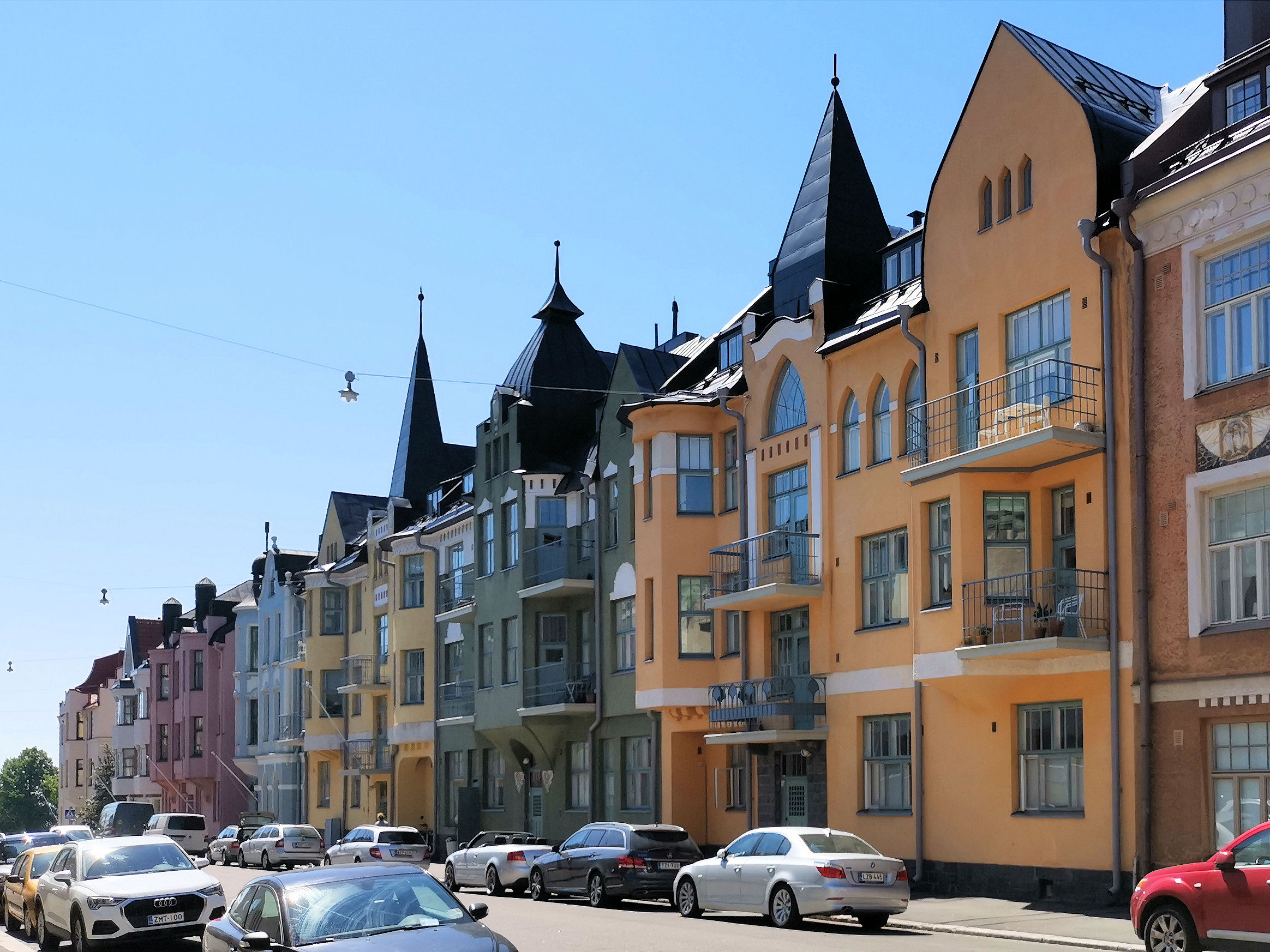
- At the Huvilakatu street in Ullanlinna

- Position of Ullanlinna within Helsinki
- Country: Finland
- Region: Uusimaa
- Sub-region: Greater Helsinki
- Municipality: Helsinki
- District: Southern
- Subdivision regions: none
- Area: 0.75 km^{2} (0.29 sq mi)
- Population (2005): 10,040
  - Density: 13,387/km^{2} (34,670/sq mi)
- Postal codes: 00140, 00150
- Subdivision number: 07
- Neighbouring subdivisions: Eira; Punavuori; Kaivopuisto

Ullanlinna (Finnish: [ˈulːɑnˌlinːɑ]; Swedish: Ulrikasborg) is a city district of Helsinki, in Finland. Ullanlinna features a wide variety of high-quality restaurants. Korkeavuorenkatu is known for its fashion boutiques, cafés, and restaurants. The district is home to several well-known and historic establishments, such as Restaurant Sea Horse, founded in 1934 and popular among the cultural elite. In the same block stands Saslik, Finland’s oldest and most famous Russian restaurant, established in 1972. The area is also home to the Design Museum.

== History ==
The name Ullanlinna (English: "Ulla's Castle") refers to the fortification line that was built at the southern edge of the area during the 18th century (no longer visible), as part of the town fortifications, which also included the fortress of Suomenlinna. The name Ulla refers to the Swedish Queen Ulrika Eleonora (1688–1741).

In the 18th century, Helsinki’s richest man, Johan Sederholm, established a shipyard in the area, which he later came to own entirely.

During the 19th century the area was dominated by summer pavilions owned by the wealthy Helsinki middle-classes. The appearance of the area changed gradually at the end of the 19th century as the wooden houses were replaced with much higher stone buildings, designed in the prevailing Jugendstil architectural style synonymous with National Romanticism.

The central part of Ullanlinna is marked by the Tähtitorninpuisto park (English: Observatory Park), at the centre of which is the former observatory, designed by Carl Ludvig Engel in 1825 in the Neoclassical style of architecture. Other notable buildings in the district are the Design Museum and the Museum of Finnish Architecture.

== Gallery ==
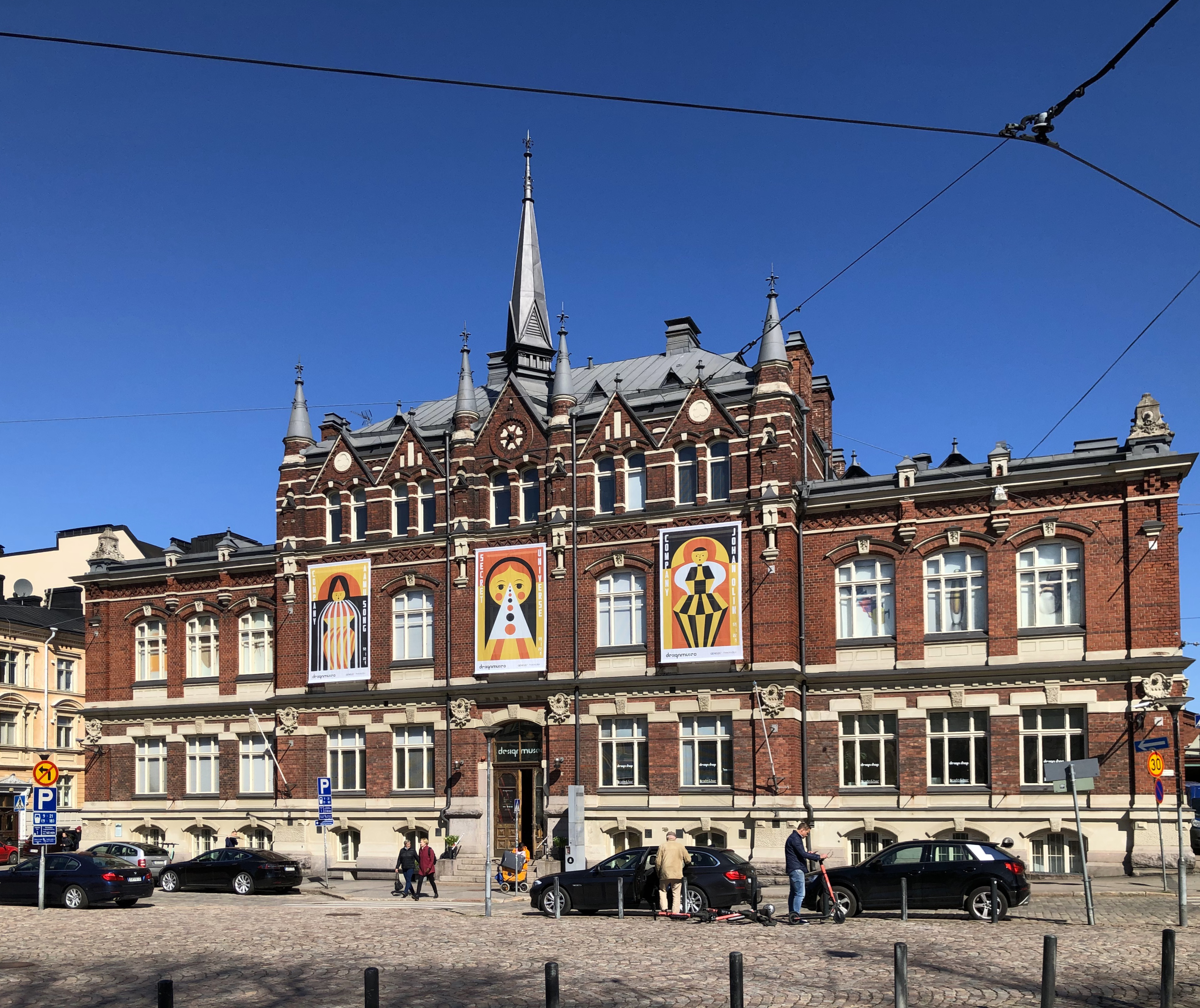
Design Museum.

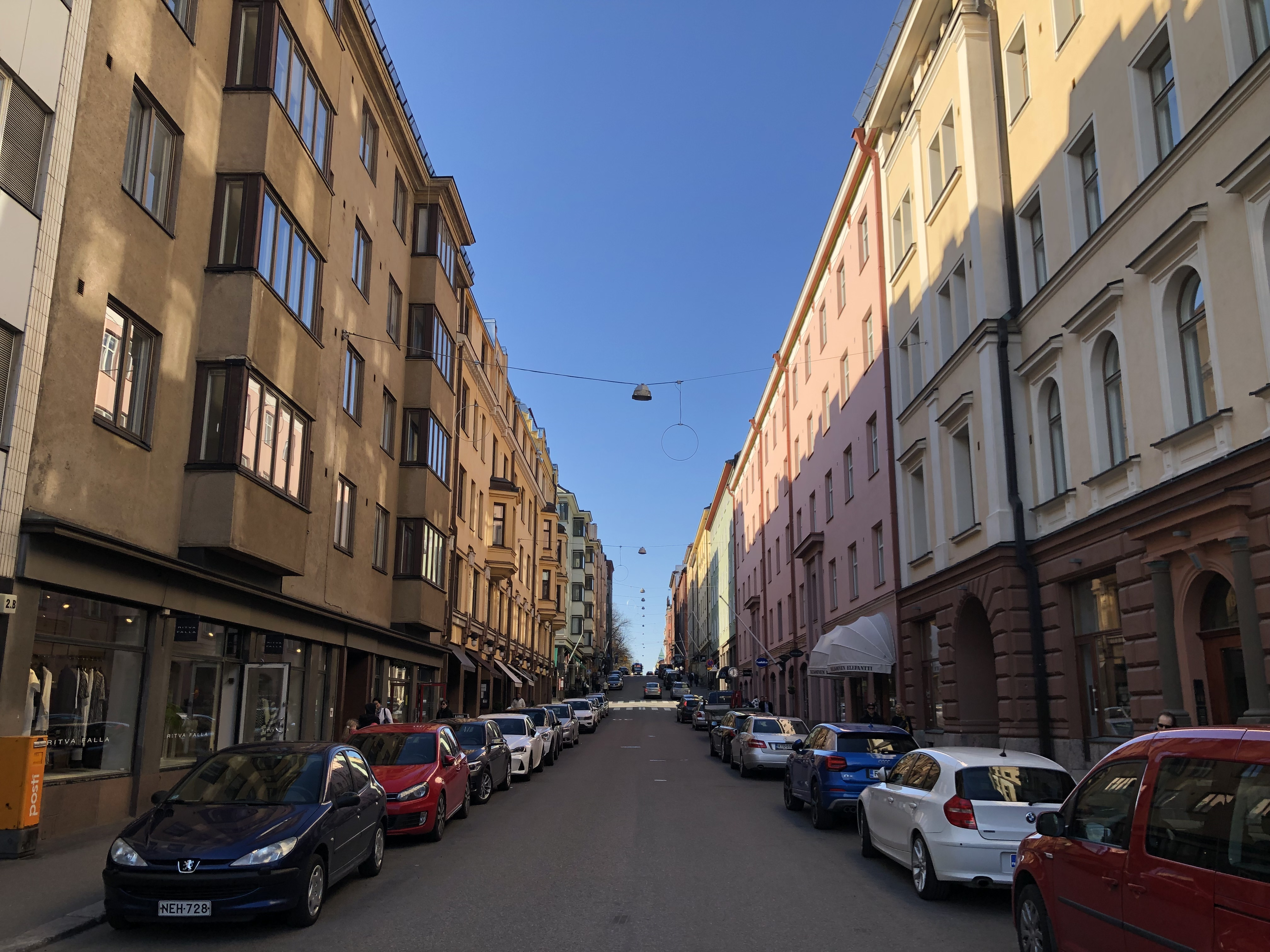
Korkeavuorenkatu.

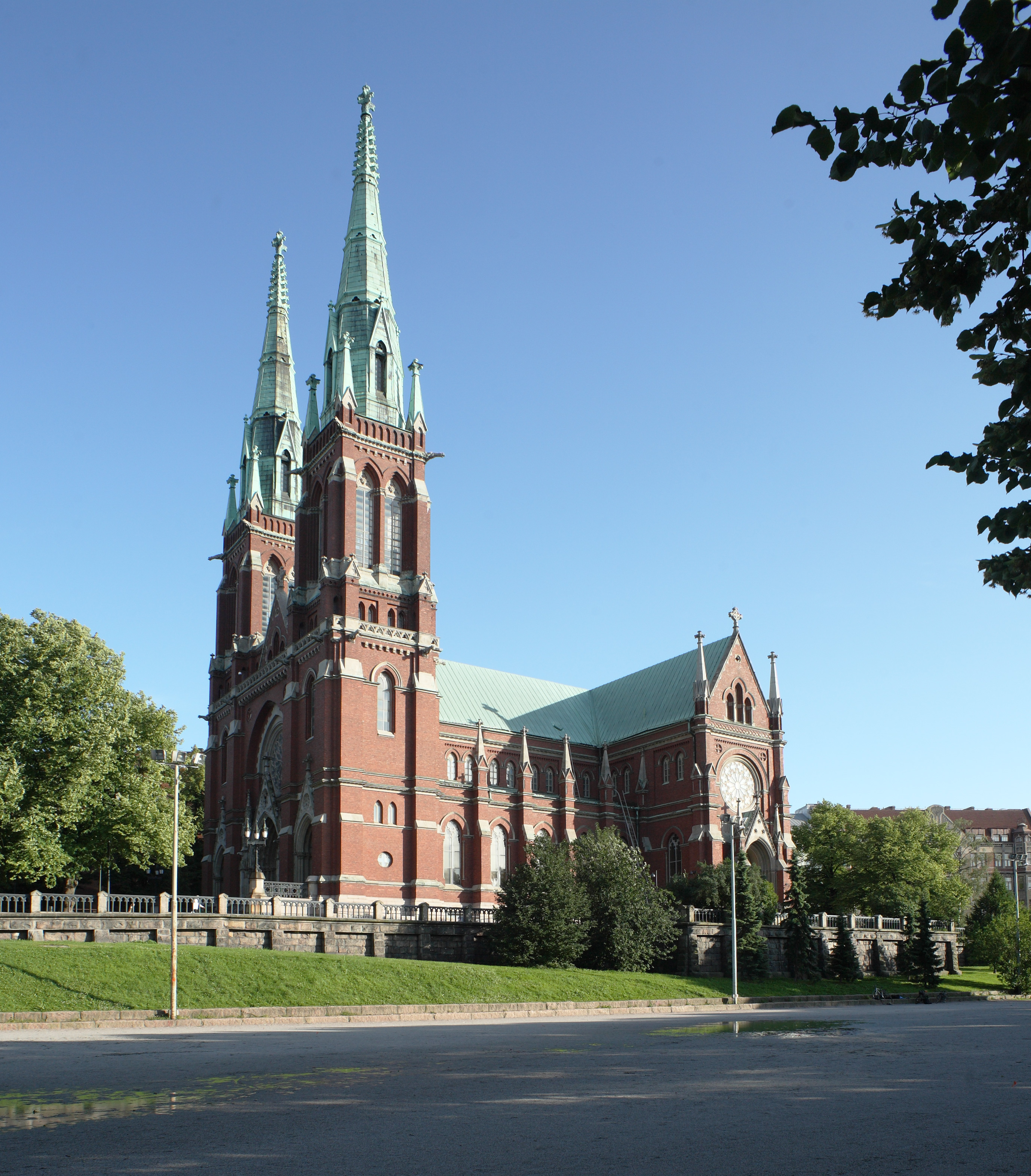
St. John's Church.

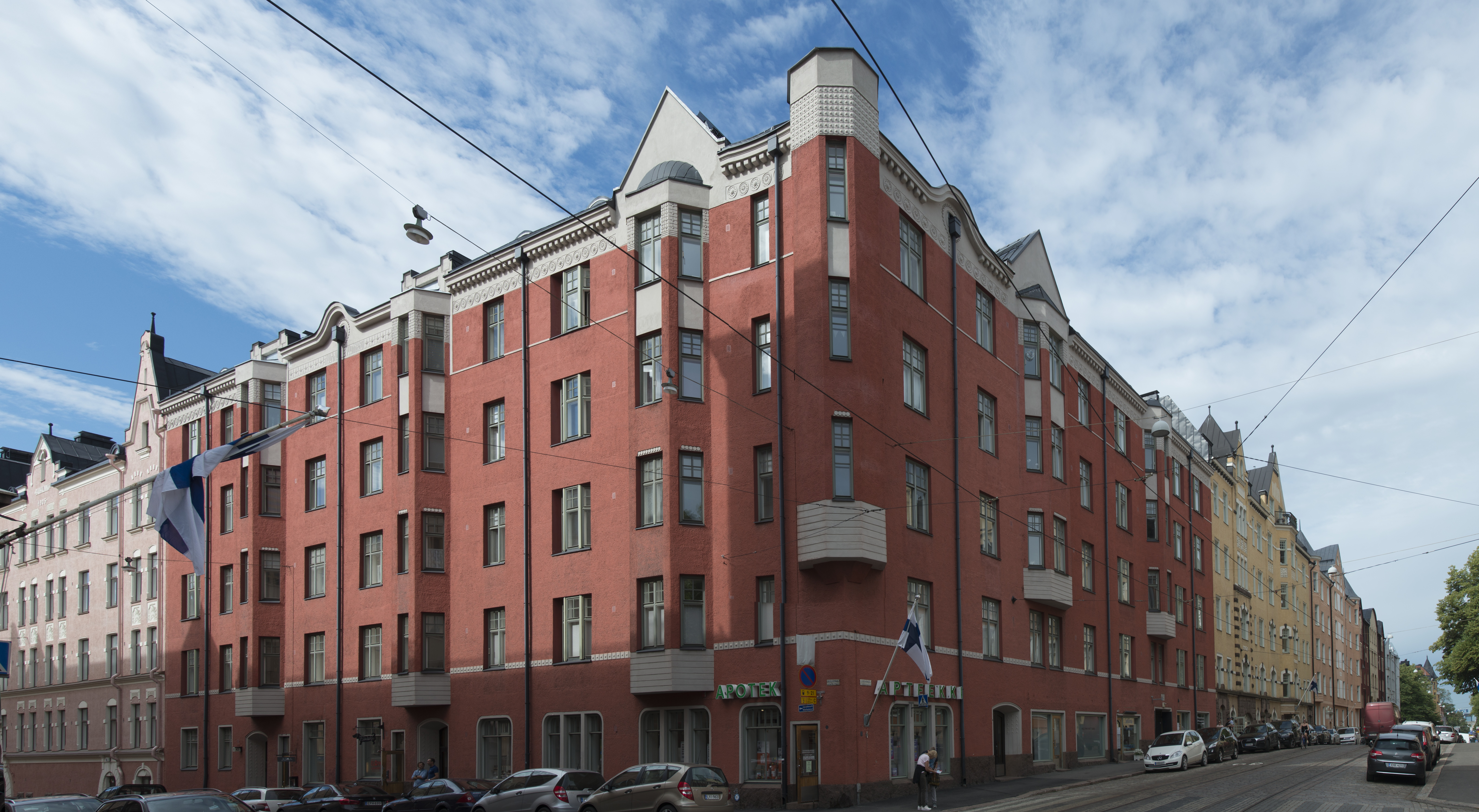
Tehtaankatu.

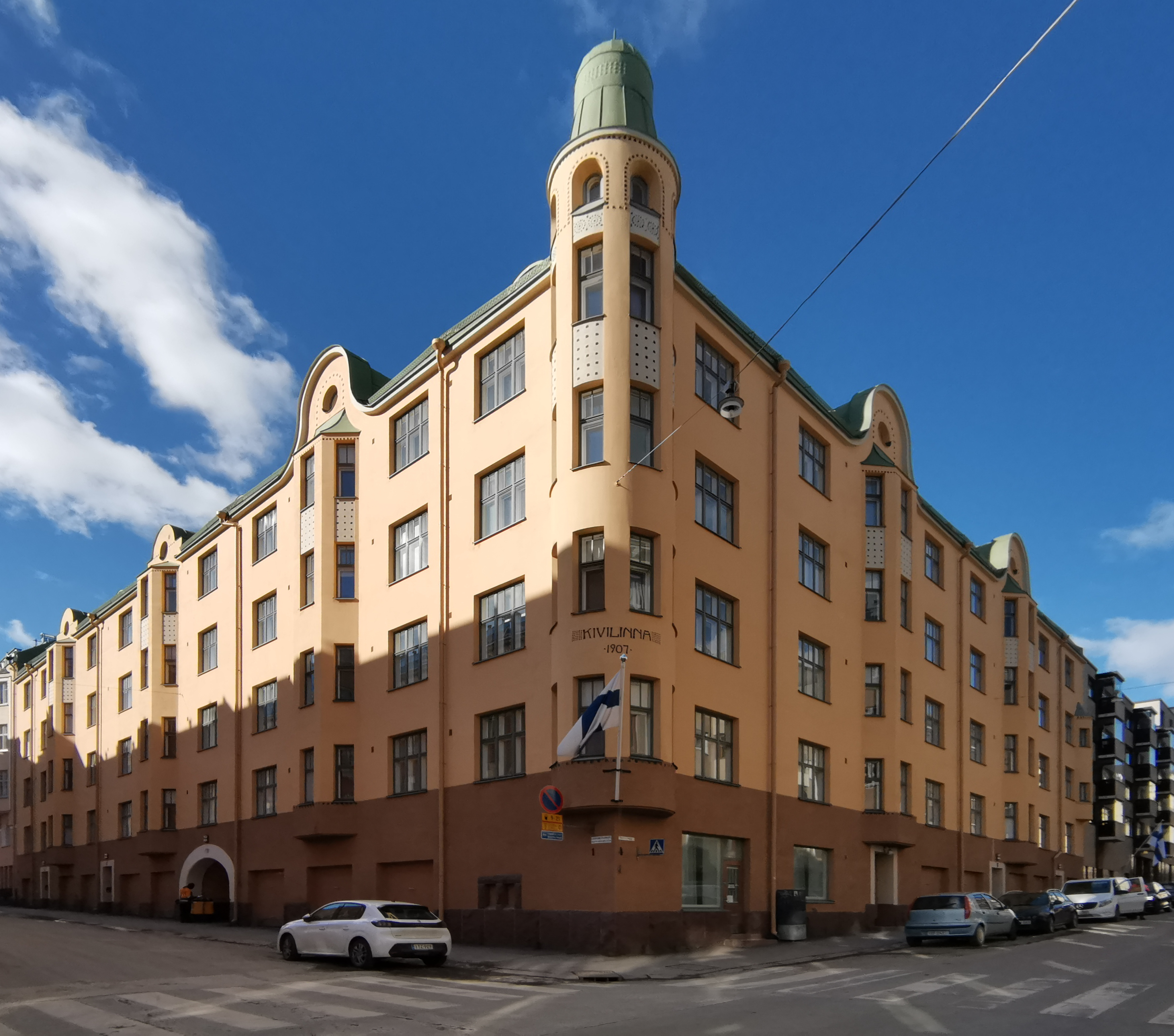
Neitsytpolku.

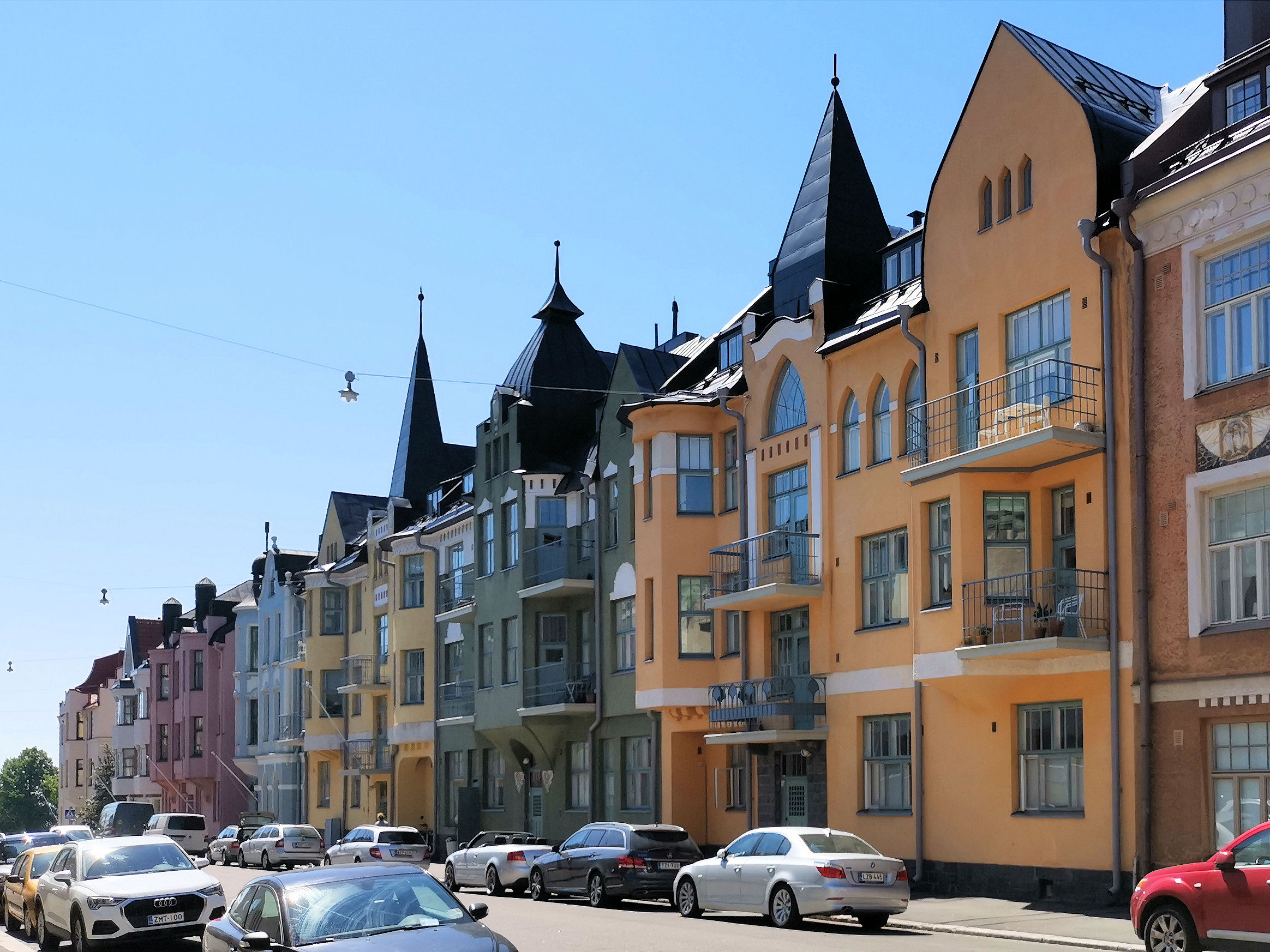
Huvilakatu.

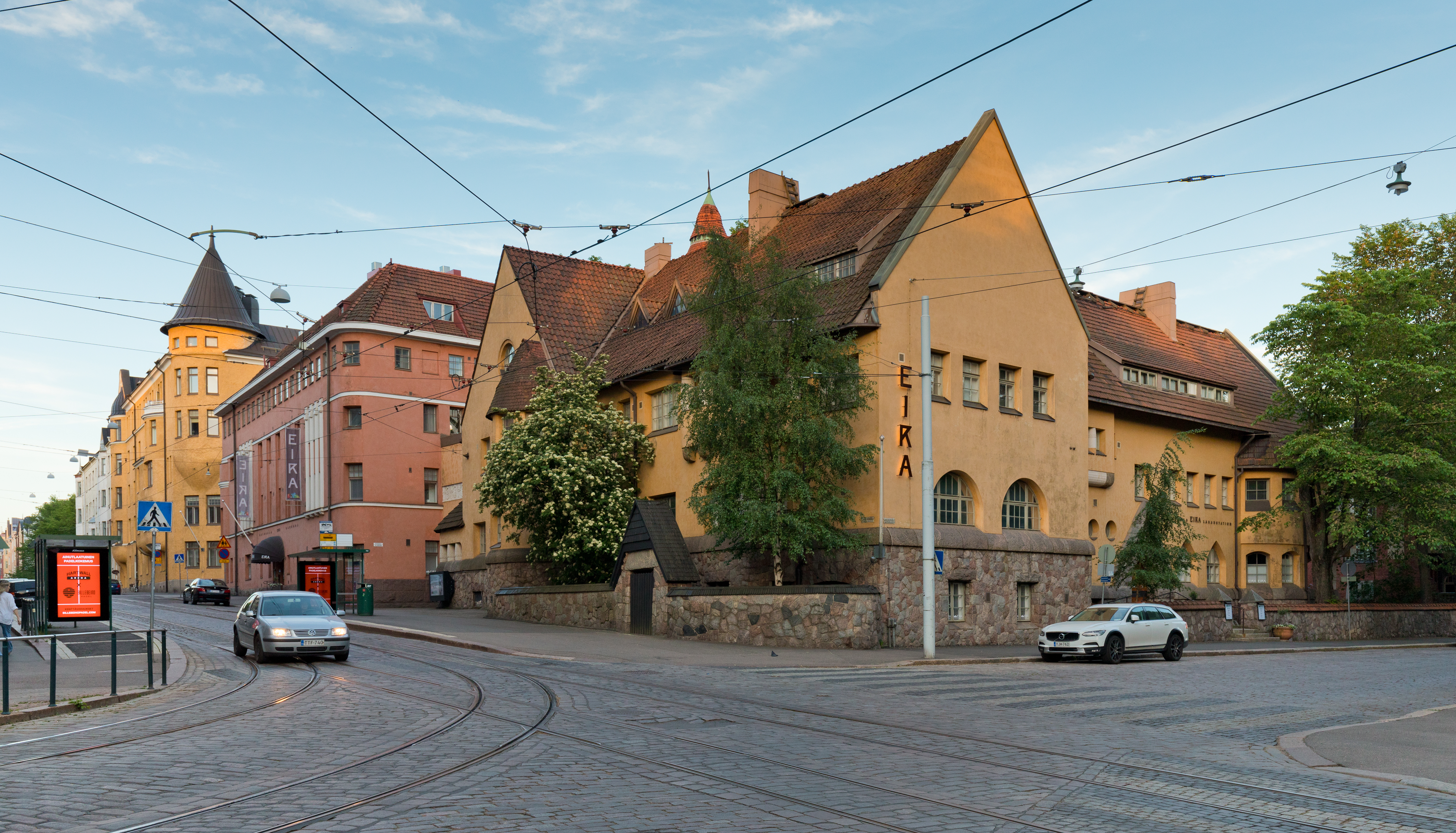
Eira Hospital.

== See also ==
- Eira
- Kaivopuisto
- Punavuori
- Design Museum
