= Die Kalewainen in Pochjola =

- Romantic German opera by Karl Müller-Berghaus
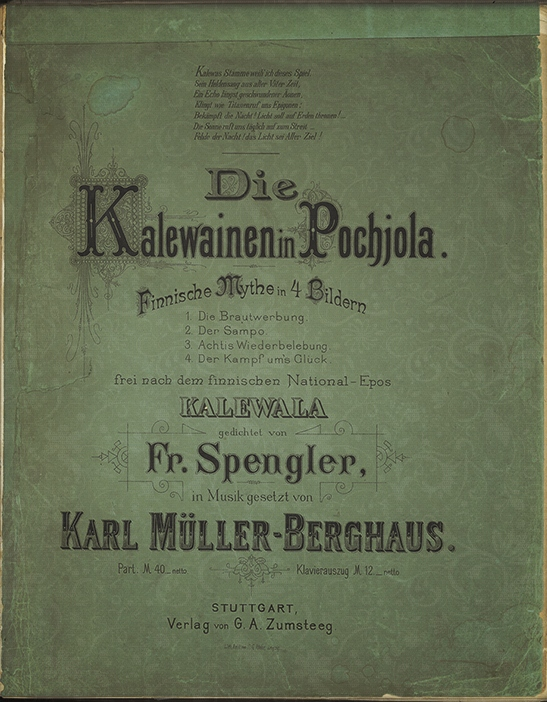
- Score cover.
- Translation: The men of Kaleva in the Northland
- Other title: Kalevalaiset Pohjolassa
- Librettist: Fritz W. O. Spengler
- Language: German
- Based on: Kalevala
- Premiere: 28 February 2017; Turku, Finland
- Website: https://www.kalewainen.fi/

Die Kalewainen in Pochjola: Finnische Mythe in 4 Bildern frei nach dem Finnischen National-Epos Kalewala (German: “The men of Kaleva in the Northland: Finnish myths in four scenes freely from the Finnish national epic Kalevala”) is an 1890 German-Finnish opera in four acts composed by the German Karl Müller-Berghaus (1829–1907) to a libretto by Fritz W. O. Spengler, freely based upon Kalevala. Although using motifs and characters from a Finnish epic, the libretto is in German language. The style of the opera represents early Richard Wagner and the romantic German opera in general.

The opera was composed in Turku, Grand Duchy of Finland, when Müller-Berghaus was working as an orchestral conductor for the Music Society of Turku. During the 19th and 20th century, the opera was never performed in toto; only the second act was given as a concert performance in Turku on 17 February 1890. The score is written for a relatively large orchestra, a chorus and seven lead roles, and there were no practical venues in that time for a full-scale performance. The première was planned at Hamburg State Opera in 1892 but because of an epidemic of cholera it never realized.

The orchestral score and the piano score of the opera were published in Stuttgart circa 1892, but Die Kalewainen in Pochjola fell slowly into oblivion. A copy of the score was discovered in Turku in 2013 and it was decided to première the opera in February 2017.

The opera has four acts:

1. Die Brautwerbung (The proposal to the bride)
2. Der Sampo (The Sampo)
3. Achtis Wiederbelebung (Resurrecting Ahti)
4. Der Kampf um’s Glück (The fight for luck).

The leading roles are Wäinämöinen, Ilmarinen, Achti alias Lemminkäinen, Luonnotar, Louchi, Ismo and a Magician (Zauberer).

When analyzing the score in 1933, the composer Sulho Ranta thought that the libretto was weak and the music was impersonal and derivative.
