= Eino Friberg =

Finnish-American writer

- Born: Eino Hjalmar Friberg; 10 May 1901; Merikarvia, Grand Duchy of Finland
- Died: 27 May 1995 (aged 94); Cambridge, United States of America
- Education: Boston University, Harvard University
- Occupations: Writer; Translator
- Children: 2
- Writing career
- Notable awards: Order of the White Rose of Finland (1988)

Eino Hjalmar Friberg (10 May 1901 – 27 May 1995) was a Finnish-born American writer. He is best known for his 1989 translation of the Finnish national epic The Kalevala.

== Early life ==
Eino Hjalmar Friberg was born in Merikarvia, Grand Duchy of Finland, in 1901 and moved to the United States when he was still a child, in 1906. At the age of seven, his eyes were damaged by a fragment of glass from a bottle of soda pop that he opened by striking it against a curb, which led to his eventual blindness at the age of 10. He attended the Perkins School for the Blind in Watertown, Massachusetts and then attended Boston University, where he received his B.A. He enrolled in a Ph.D. program in philosophy at Harvard University, but never completed his thesis. He eventually received a Master of Arts in philosophy from Harvard in the mid-1970s, after passing a French language examination.

== Career ==
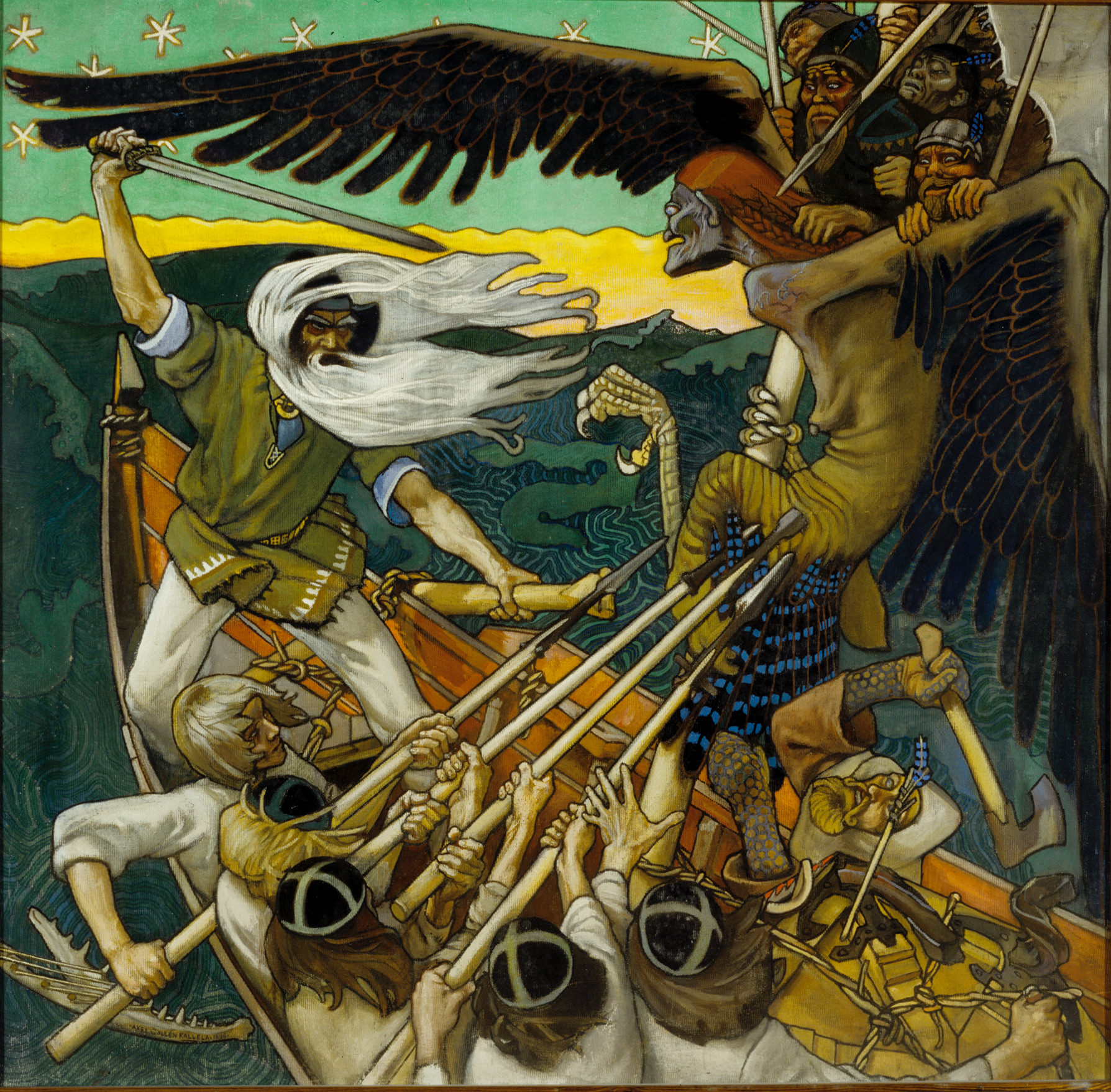
The Defense of the Sampo by Akseli Gallen-Kallela

Friberg published a book of poetry, Sparks, in 1926. During World War II, he worked in a tool and die plant in Worcester, Massachusetts and became a labor organizer for the United Steelworkers of America.

At the age of 75, he began to translate into the English language the Finnish national epic The Kalevala, working from a Braille copy. This was the first time The Kalevala had been translated by a native Finnish speaker into English, and was the fourth full translation overall.

In addition to his literary work, Friberg was deeply involved in religion. He attended the Swedenborgian School of Theology and was ordained as a minister in the Swedenborgian, Congregational and Unitarian Churches, serving as a minister in Congregational and Unitarian churches in New England. In 1949, on the porch of his house in Westminster, Massachusetts, Friberg had a "mystical encounter," about which he wrote an unpublished manuscript. Theologian Reinhold Neibuhr commented on the manuscript that "I know of no record of spiritual pilgrimage more authentic."

== Awards ==
- The Finnish American Translators Association awarded Friberg an honorary membership for his translation of The Kalevala.
- In 1988, Friberg returned to Finland for the first time since his emigration to receive the Order of the White Rose of Finland.
- In 1989, Friberg was honored with an Arts & Letters Award and Certificate of Merit by the Finlandia Foundation, New York Metropolitan Chapter for his translation of The Kalevala.

== Personal life ==
Friberg was married three times and had two daughters. He died in Cambridge, Massachusetts, aged 94.

== Literary works ==
- The Kalevala: Epic of the Finnish People (1989). ISBN 951-1-10137-4

== Other sources ==
- The Kalevala: Epic of the Finnish People – Inside front page.
- "Epic Task Ties Poet to Finnish Roots," Boston Globe, May 7, 1988, Metro Section, page 2 (link requires subscription or fee)
