= Juminkeko Foundation =

Finnish cultural organization

- Juminkeko-säätiö
- Formation: 1991; 34 years ago
- Type: Foundation
- Purpose: Cultural preservation and promotion
- Headquarters: Kuhmo, Finland
- Coordinates: 64.126532°N 29.513442°E
- Fields: Kalevala and Karelian culture
- Official language: Finnish
- Key people: Markku Nieminen (chairman)
- Website: www.juminkeko.fi/en/index.asp

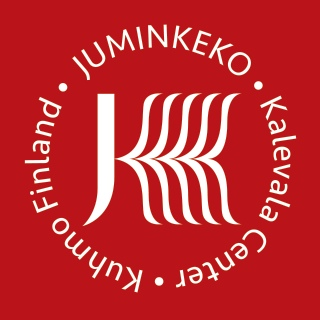

The Juminkeko Foundation (Finnish: Juminkeko-säätiö), or simply Juminkeko, is a Finnish organization founded in 1991. It runs Juminkeko, an eponymous information centre of the national epic Kalevala and Karelian culture located in Kuhmo, Finland. The centre was designed by the Finnish architects Mikko Heikkinen and Markku Komonen and was completed in 1999.

== Activities ==
The Juminkeko Foundation's purposes are to preserve the Kalevala-related cultural heritage and to promote cultural exchanges between Finland and the Republic of Karelia, Russia. The foundation organizes exhibitions and other events in Kuhmo and in other parts of Finland and the Republic of Karelia. Juminkeko’s activity also includes the publishing, the collection and filing of traditional material and the intervention for the revitalization of the so-called poetic villages of Viena, famous for the runosinging tradition. Juminkeko operates also as national cultural centre for children in the field of folk tradition.

The Juminkeko Foundation organizes research trips and cultural trips to the Karelia of Viena. Its partners are the Finnish Literature Society's archive of folk poetry, the Kalevala Society (Kalevalaseura) and the Institute of Linguistics, Literature and History Karelian Research Centre which belongs to the Russian Academy of Sciences.

For its core activities, the foundation is supported by the Ministry of Education and Culture. The support for other activities comes from several projects such as European Union projects, cooperation projects within neighbouring areas and projects funded by the Finnish Cultural Foundation.

=== Revitalization of the poetic villages of Viena ===
Since 1990, the Juminkeko Foundation has been cooperating with the Karelian organization Arhippa Perttunen Foundation for the revitalization of the poetic villages of Viena.

This 30-year project's purpose is to preserve the threatened Viena culture. In 1993, the project for the revitalization of the poetic villages of Viena was recognized by UNESCO as part of the World Decade for Cultural Development.

From 1996 until 2001, Juminkeko successfully petitioned the World Monuments Watch to have Panozero village included in the list of the hundred most threatened cultural sites in the world. In 2005, Panozero received the medal Europa Nostra which is the highest European prize in the preservation of cultural heritage.
