= The Children of Mon and Man =

2008 epic poem by Bùi Viêt Hoa

- Author: Bùi Viêt Hoa
- Original title: Con cháu Mon Mân
- Language: Vietnamese
- Genre: Epic poetry
- Publisher: Juminkeko
- Publication date: 2008
- Publication place: Finland, Vietnam
- Pages: 564pp.

The Children of Mon and Man (Vietnamese: Con cháu Mon Mân) is an epic poem based on Vietnamese folk poetry and mythology, published in 2008 by Vietnamese linguist Bùi Viêt Hoa. The epic is written in the official language of Vietnam, i.e. Vietnamese, and follows the traditional seven-byte poem dimension of the Vietnamese people.

The Children of Mon and Man is based in part on the Finnish epic poem, Kalevala. It is a joint publication of the Kaunokirjallisuus-kustantamo (Van Hoc) and the Kalevala and Karelian Cultural Information Center Juminkeko, which has also been funded by the Finnish Ministry for Foreign Affairs. The work is written mainly in Finland.

== History ==
After defending her doctorate at the University of Budapest on the differences and similarities between Kalevala meter poetry and mythology of Muong people, Hoa began to create her own epic for Vietnam, using the process of the birth of the Kalevala as a model. Hoa spent seven years doing this, and The Children of Mon and Man were published in 2008. Kuhmo's Juminkeko Foundation, which was involved in the project, launched a website about The Children of Mon and Man on the 2009 Kalevala Day in Finnish, English and Vietnamese.

The Children of Mon and Man are based in part on Vietnamese folk poetry previously recorded in traditional archives, in part on a tradition and mythical stories that are still alive today. About 20-30 percent of the epic verses are the author's own. The epic plot combines poems, myths, legends, fairy tales and lyrical songs from different peoples so that the protagonists of different peoples see the events from their own perspective. Bùi Viêt Hoa's aim was to create an epic from which all Vietnamese nationalities could find something of their own. The material has been collected from at least 40 peoples living in Vietnam. During her expeditions, Hoa also became an eye for the authorities, as the status of minorities was a rather sensitive issue in the early 2000s. The Children of Mon and Man received a somewhat mixed reception in Vietnam.

== Subject matter ==
The epic is divided into two entities, the first or mythical part of which tells of the birth of things important to the world and to the Vietnamese. The second part of the epic is a heroic epic that tells the story of the descendants of mythical ancestors and their adventures, as well as the birth of the Vietnamese state.

The mythical part tells the story of the ancestors of all people, the primordial gods Mon and Man. Its scenes include the birth of the world, the birth of man from the egg, the flood, the mythical pumpkin, the myth of the world tree, the request of fire from the gods, and the creation of mythical heroes, many of which have a counterpart in the Kalevala. In the second part, people are at the center of events, and the gods are left behind. The hero part tells the story of three peoples who end up in a common battle against an outside enemy and then live in harmony.

== See also ==
- Vietnamese mythology
