= John Martin Crawford (scholar) =

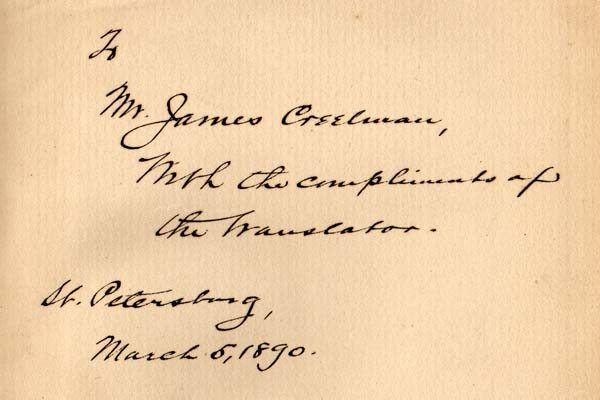
An inscription made by John Martin Crawford in a copy of Kalevala (1890)

John Martin Crawford (October 18, 1845 – 1916) was an American physician and scholar who translated the Finnish epic Kalevala into English based on a previous German translation by Franz Anton Schiefner published in 1852, to be published for the first time in 1888.

== Biography ==
Crawford was born in Herrick, Pennsylvania, and taught public school for three years prior to attending college. He enrolled in Lafayette College in 1867 and graduated in 1871. It was there he was inspired by Professor Thomas Conrad Porter to translate the Kalevala. In 1872 Crawford returned to teaching Math and Latin at the Chickering Institute in Ohio. During this time he studied medicine, receiving three degrees from schools in Cincinnati.

In June 1889, Crawford was appointed by President Benjamin Harrison as consul-general of the United States to Russia.

He also translated the five volume series "Industries of Russia" published in 1893 for World's Columbian Exposition.

=== Published works ===
- Crawford, John Martin, ed. (1888). The Kalevala: The Epic Poem of Finland. ISBN 0-7661-8938-4.
  - Volume 1 , e-text via www.gutenberg.org
  - Volume 2 , e-text via www.gutenberg.org
- Crawford, John Martin, ed. (1893), The industries of Russia
  - Dept. of Trade and Manufactures Ministry of Finance, Manufactures and Trade, vol. I
  - Dept. of Trade and Manufactures Ministry of Finance, Manufactures and Trade, vol. II
  - Dept. of Agriculture Ministry of Crown Domains, Agriculture and Forestry, vol. III
  - Keppen, A., Mining and Metallurgy, vol. IV
  - Dept. of Trade and Manufactures Ministry of Finance, Siberia and the Great Siberian Railway, vol. V
