= Vantaa Chamber Choir =

Mixed choir from Vantaa, Finland

Vantaa Chamber Choir (Finnish: Vantaan Kamarikuoro) is a Finnish mixed choir which was established in the city of Vantaa in 1986. The choir sings a range of styles including modern folk and Finnish pop music.

It was founded as the alumni choir of the Vantaanjoki choir, the predecessor of the Vaskivuori Secondary School Chamber Choir.

== Conductors ==
- Toivo Korhonen (1986–1998)
- Ilona Korhonen (1998–2011)
- Juha Kuivanen (2011–2012)
- Tiia Mustonen (2013–2014)
- Ilona Korhonen (2014–)

== Discography ==
- Lauluja Kuninkaantien varrelta (1993) – Folk songs (VKCD 293)
- Oi muistatko vielä sen virren (1997) – Hymns (Fazer Finnlevy CD 0630-19117-2)
- Marian virsi (2005) – Poems from Kalevala with modern arrangements (VKCD 305)
