= The Defense of the Sampo =

Painting by Akseli Gallen-Kallela

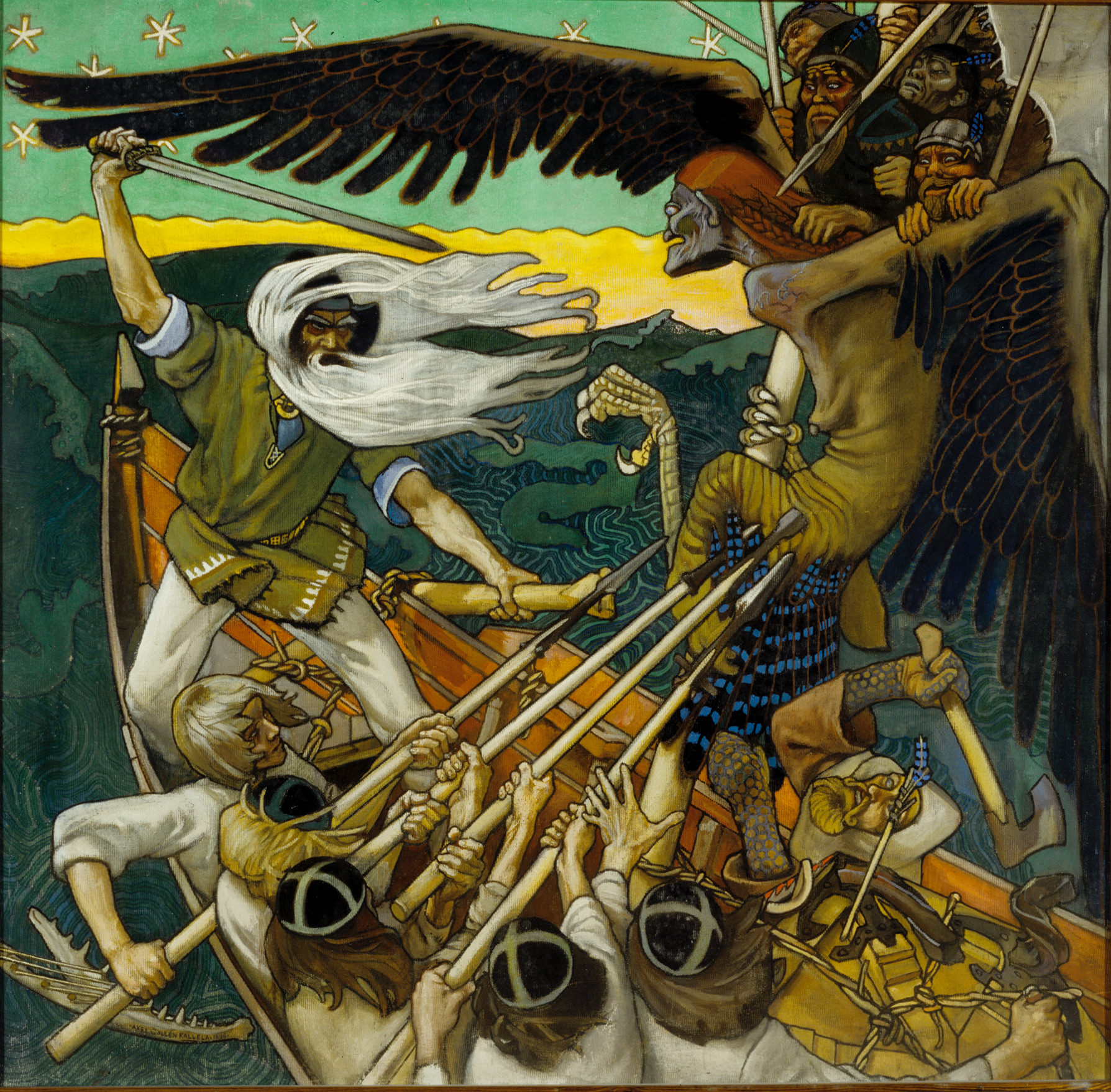
- Artist: Akseli Gallen-Kallela
- Year: 1896
- Medium: Tempera
- Dimensions: 122 cm × 125 cm (48 in × 49 in)
- Location: Turku Art Museum, Turku

The Defense of the Sampo (Finnish: Sammon puolustus) is a tempera-on-canvas Romantic national painting created in 1896 by Finnish painter Akseli Gallen-Kallela. The painting illustrates a passage from the Kalevala, the Finnish national epic compiled by Elias Lönnrot in the 19th century.

The scene portrayed is taken from the 43rd song of the epic, where the hero Väinämöinen, seen wielding a sword, has stolen the precious artifact Sampo from the evil witch Louhi, and she, having taken the form of a giant bird, is trying to reclaim it. The battle for the Sampo is also given a deeper connotation as a battle for the soul of Finland.

== Reception ==
When the painting was first exhibited, it received widespread attention and was considered to be Gallen-Kallela's finest work. Gallen-Kallela's vision of a warlike Väinämöinen was seen as a radical departure from the old, gray-bearded sage of older renditions. In the painting, Väinämöinen's long, flowing white hair and beard are dramatically contrasted by his strong, muscular body.

The painting was originally commissioned by a wealthy patron from Helsinki, Salomo Wuorio, for his dining room. According to Gallen-Kallela's notes, however, the deal was amicably dissolved when the patron's wife had an extremely negative reaction to the finished work. Afterwards, The Defense of the Sampo was purchased by the Turku Arts Association (Turun taideyhdistys) for the previously unheard-of price of 4000 marks.

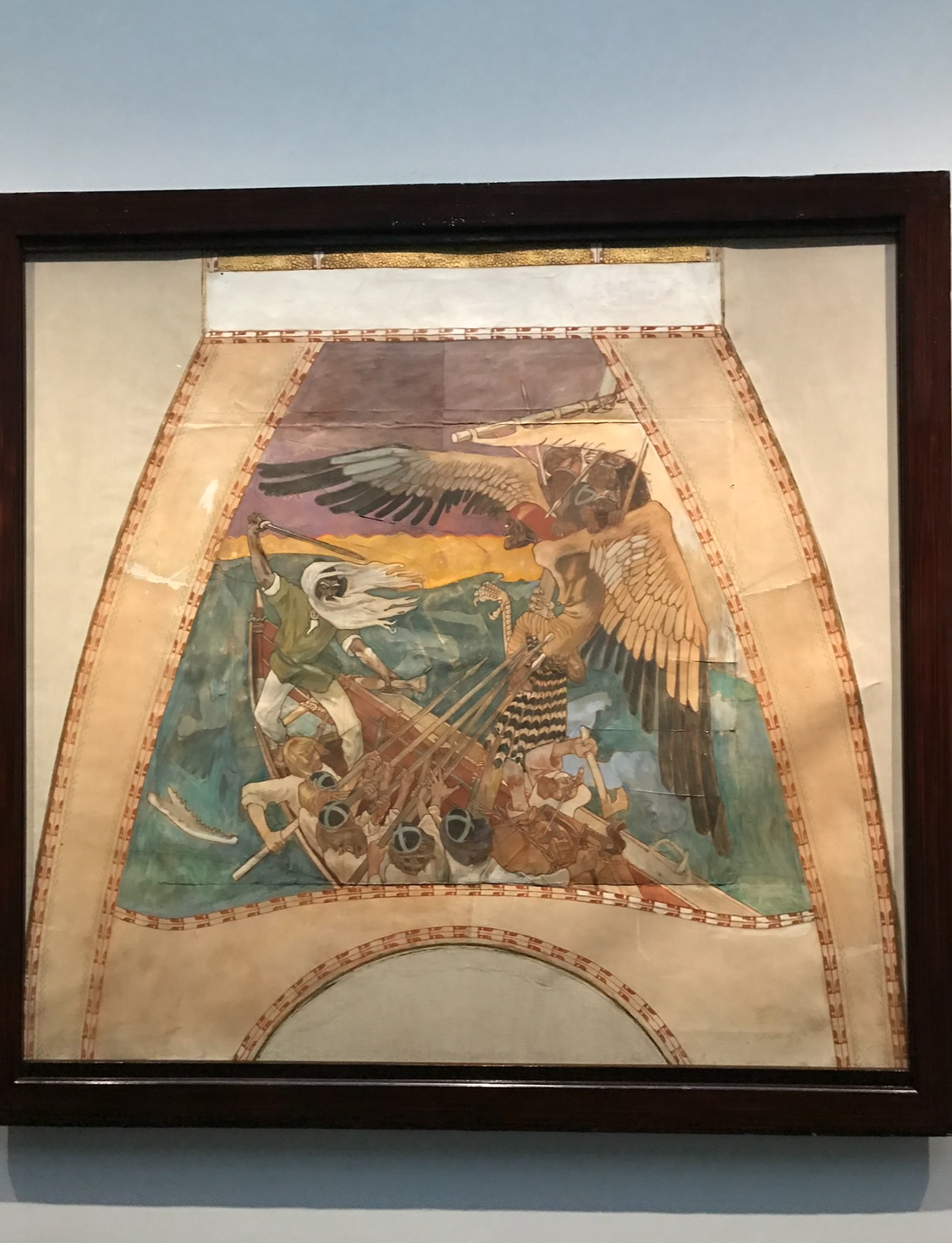
Sketch of the fresco made by Gallen-Kallela.

Gallen-Kallela created a well-received fresco of the same painting for the Finnish gallery at the Paris World's fair 1900 (destroyed at the end of the fair), and again in 1928, for the National Museum of Finland foyer in Helsinki where it remains viewable to this day.
