= Arhippa Perttunen =

Karelian runic singer (1769–1841)

Arhippa Perttunen (Russian: Архип Иванович Перттунен; 1769–1841) was a Karelian runic singer.

== Biography ==
Arhippa Perttunen was born probably in the village of Latvajärvi (now Ladvozero in Kalevalsky District) in 1769.

Around 1834, Elias Lönnrot met Perttunen for three days, while on his fifth field trip collecting poems for the Kalevala. Perttunen would have sung in the Karelian dialect, so it was necessary for Lönnrot to make some modifications to make the poems more understandable to Finnish readers. Later, two other collectors, Johan Fredrik Cajan (in 1836) and Matthias Alexander Castrén (in 1839), visited Perttunen, and in total 85 texts of Perttunen's poetry were collected. Perttunen would have performed the poems orally. Stylistically, his text contains widespread use of alliteration and parallelism, similarly to other singers featured in the Kalevala. His tradition was also carried on by his son Miihkali, who collected 81 of his poems.

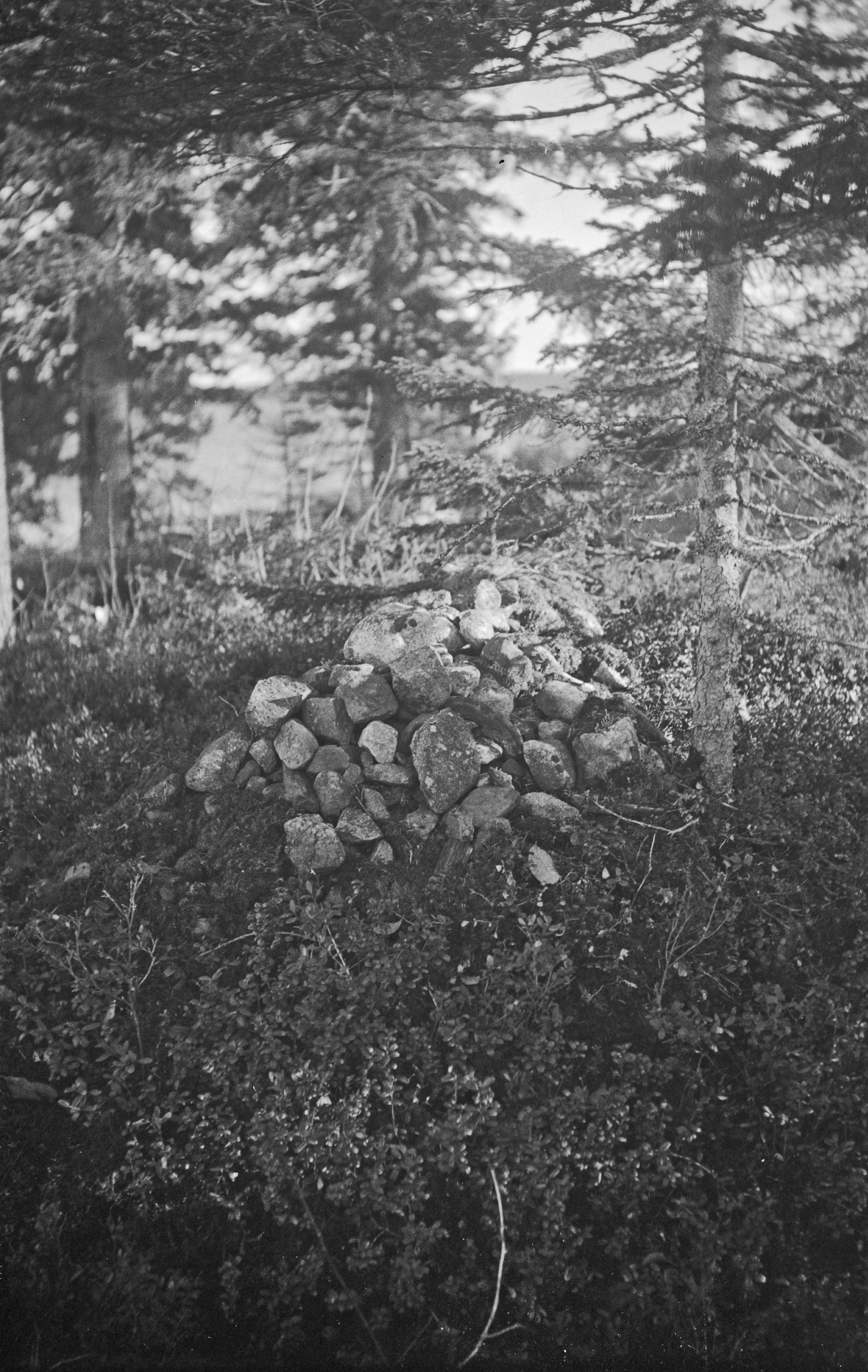
Possible grave of Arhippa Perttunen in Vuokkiniemi.

Perttunen died in 1841 and was buried in the village of Latvajärvi.

The State Prize of the Karelian ASSR was named after him.

== Literature ==
- Saarinen, Jukka (2018). Runolaulun poetiikka: Säe, syntaksi ja parallelismi Arhippa Perttusen runoissa [The poetics of oral poetry: verse structure, syntax, and parallelism in the texts of Arhippa Perttunen] (PhD thesis) (in Finnish). University of Helsinki. hdl:10138/228692. ISBN 978-951-51-3918-4.
