= Müller Brothers =

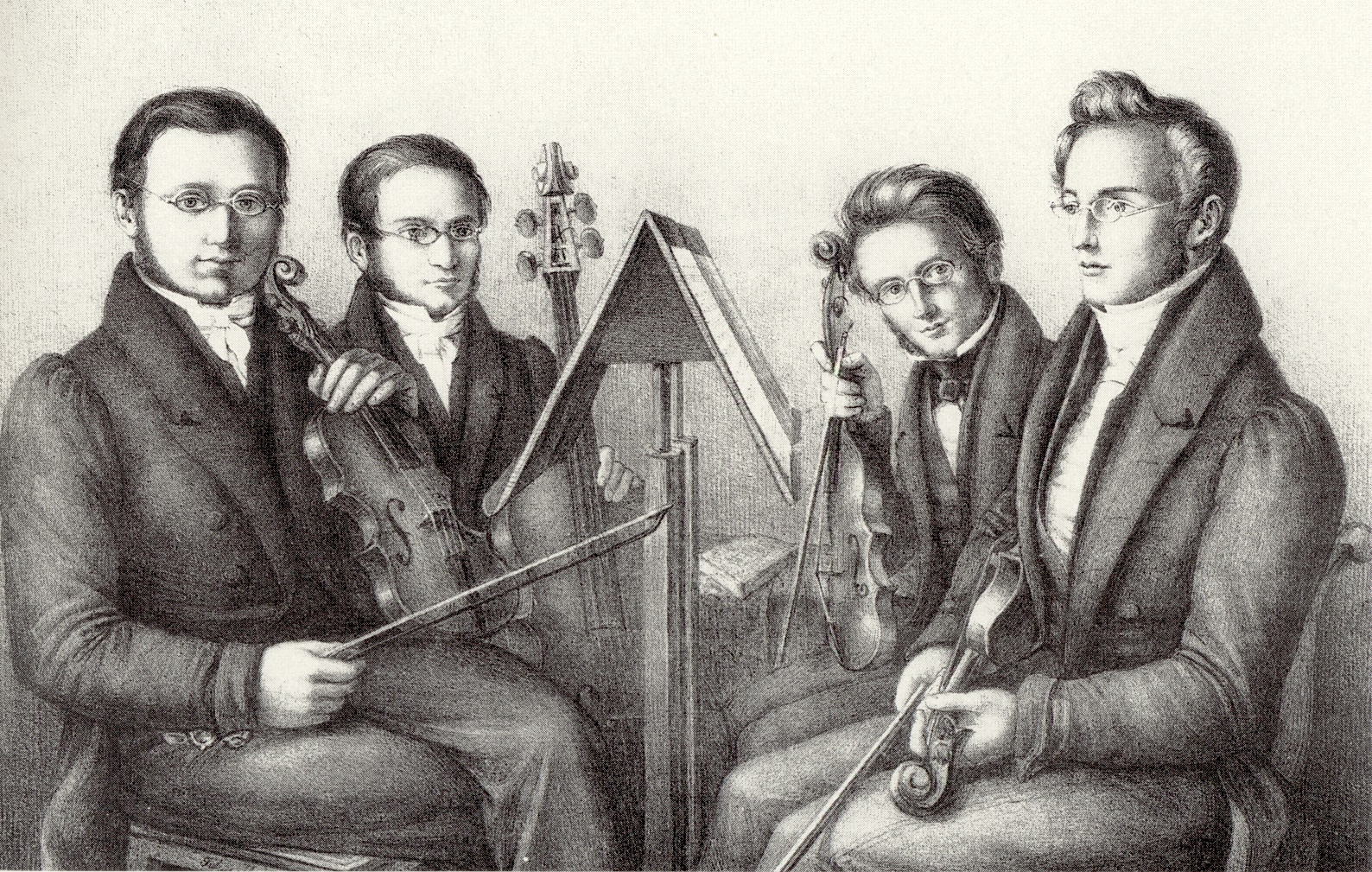
- Gebrüder Müller in 1832

Background information
- Origin: Duchy of Brunswick
- Past members: Carl Friedrich Müller (first violin); Franz Ferdinand Georg Müller (second violin); Theodor Heinrich Müller (viola); August Theodor Müller (cello)

The Gebrüder Müller (“Müller Brothers”) was the name of two noted German (Duchy of Brunswick) string quartets both composed of four brothers.

== Players in the senior quartet ==
The elder brothers were the sons as well as pupils of the principal musician to the Duke of Brunswick, Ägidius Christoph Müller (1765–1841), and were all of them born in the city of Brunswick. Karl (Carl) Friedrich Müller (1797–1873) was first violin in the quartet and was also concertmaster to the Duke. Theodor Heinrich Müller (1799–1855) was the viola player. August Theodor Müller (1802–75) played the cello, and Franz Ferdinand Georg Müller (1808–55) was the second violin. They were especially educated by their father for quartet work, and were conceded to have brought the art of string quartet playing to a degree of perfection previously unknown.

The Müller brothers were ambitious for greater fame than could be obtained within their own limited environment, but their employer, the Duke of Brunswick, had stipulated that none of his musicians should participate in any musical performance outside that connected with his own corps. So in 1830 they resigned their employment. Their first appearance outside Brunswick was in Hamburg, where they met with such success that they were invited to Berlin, where they were received with great enthusiasm. An extended tour throughout Germany followed, and in 1837 they performed in Paris. Other tours made them known throughout the world.

They confined their programmes almost entirely to the works of Haydn, Mozart, and Beethoven, and were also a very important influence in cultivating music appreciation.

== The younger Müller quartet ==
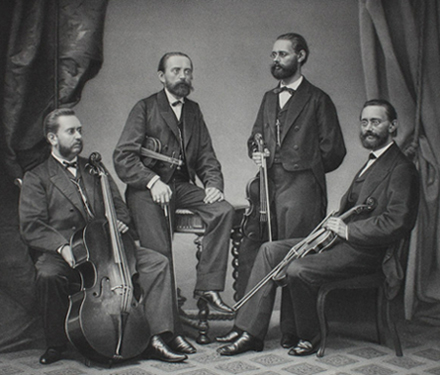
The younger Müller quartet: from left, Wilhelm, Karl, Hugo, and Bernhard Müller.

The so-called younger Müller quartet was formed in 1855 by four sons of Karl Friedrich Müller. This quartet existed till 1873.

- 1st violin: Karl Müller-Berghaus (14 April 1829 – 11 November 1907), also known as a conductor and a composer. As he took a position of a conductor in Rostock, his place in the quartet was taken by Leopold Auer.
- 2nd violin: Hugo Müller (21 September 1832 – 26 June 1886).
- Viola: Bernhard Müller (24 February 1825 – 4 September 1895).
- Cello: Wilhelm Müller (1 June 1834 – September 1897).
