= Lemminkäinen =

Character in Finnish mythology

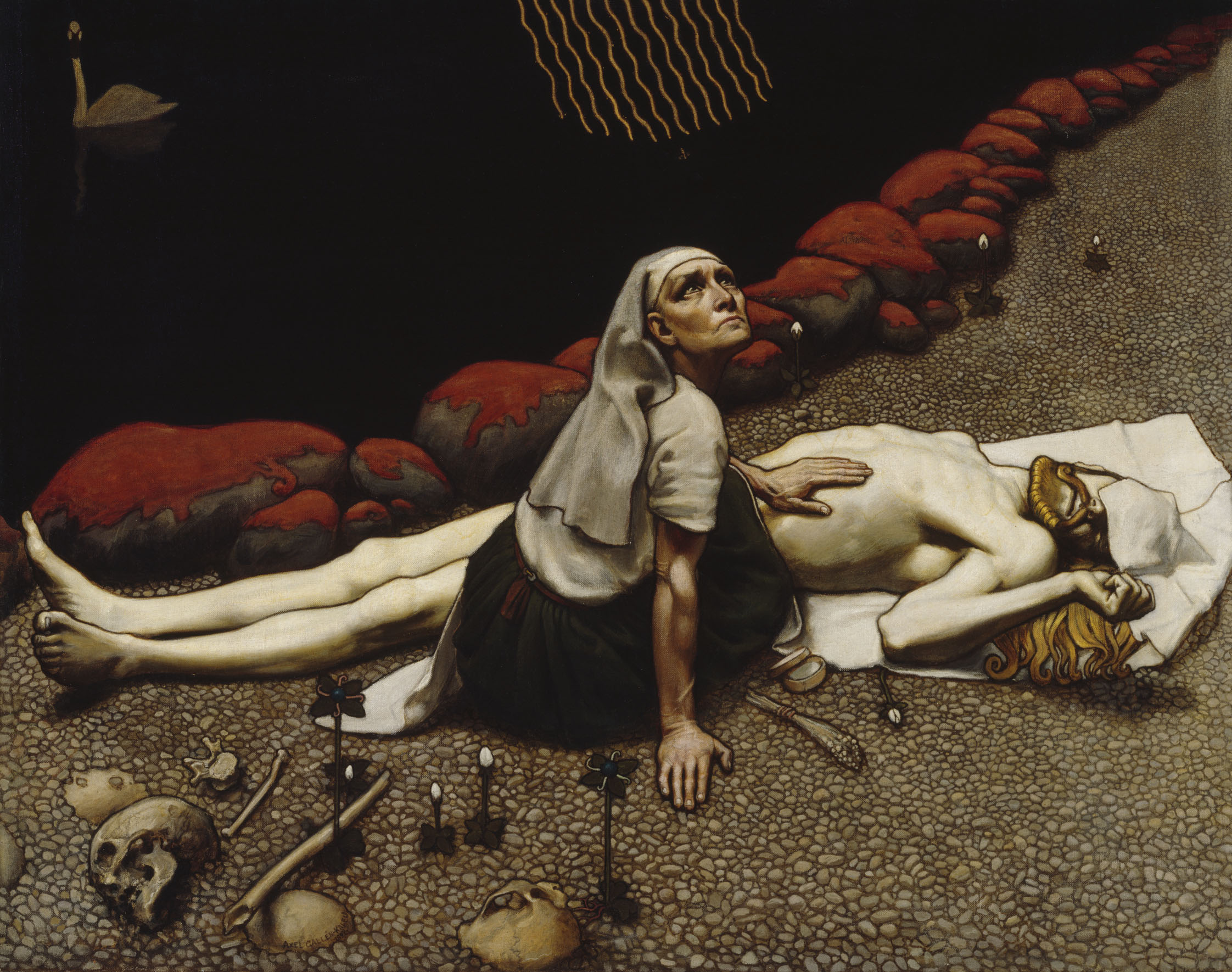
Lemminkäinen's Mother, an 1897 painting by Akseli Gallen-Kallela: She is shown having just gathered the broken body of her son from the dark river of Tuonela.

Lemminkäinen (Finnish pronunciation: [ˈlemːiŋˌkæi̯nen]) or Lemminki (pronounced [ˈlemːiŋki]) is a prominent figure in Finnish mythology. He also appears in Karelian and Estonian folk poetry. He is one of the heroes of the Kalevala, where his character is a composite of several separate heroes of oral poetry. He is usually depicted as young and good-looking, with wavy red hair.

The original, mythological Lemminkäinen is a shamanistic figure. In the Kalevala, he has been blended together with epic war-heroes Kaukomieli/Kaukamoinen and Ahti Saarelainen.

== Name ==
Variations of Lemminkäinen's name include Lemmingäinen, Lemmitty, Ihalempi, Kaukalempi, Lemmykkäinen and Lemmin poika, as well as Estonian Lembito, Lemming, Lemmingäne, Lemmingine, Lemming poega, Lemmergüne and Lemmik. It is connected to the themes of fire and erotic love, much like the name of Lempo. Anna-Leena Siikala described Lemminkäinen's name as "fit for a god in fertility rites".

An Ingrian runic song calls Lemminkäinen "Tarnalainen", which Kaarle Krohn connected to the "Tarsillainen" who is given a Norse funeral (burned in a boat), as well as the following names from wedding songs: Tervulainen, Teinulainen, Tenhulainen, Terholainen, Terheläinen, and Teikamoinen.

== In runic songs ==
=== Song of Lemminkäinen ===
In the runic song Song of Lemminkäinen (Lemminkäisen virsi), Lemminkäinen goes to a mythical location such as Pohjola, Päivölä or Väinölä (among others) either to join a banquet he wasn't invited to, or to meet with relatives. His mother, or three luonnottaret, tell Lemminkäinen not to go, for there are many dangers on his path. He goes anyway, survives the dangers, drinks a pint of beer with snakes in it and kills the one who offered him the beer.

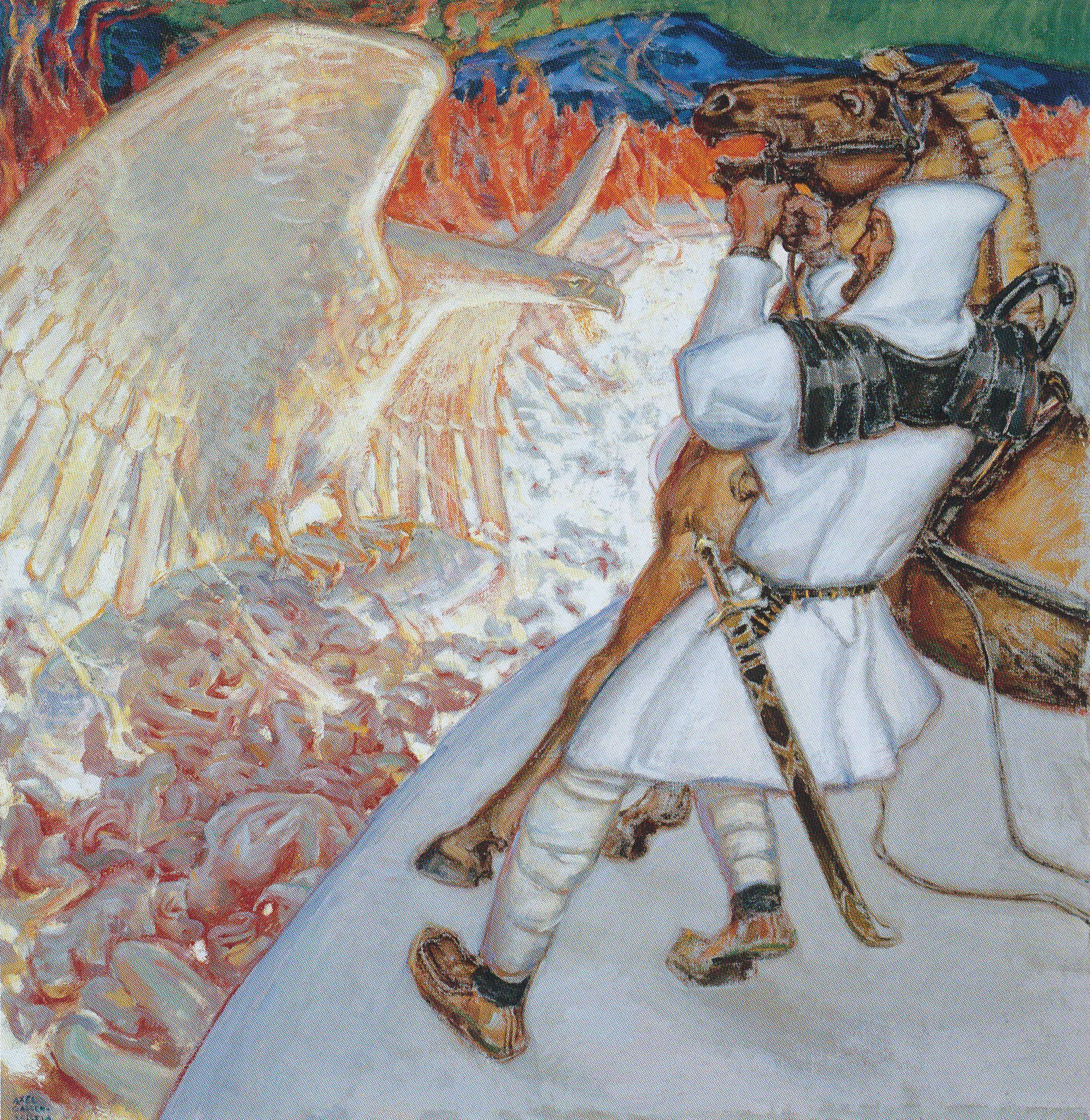
Facing a fiery kokko eagle at a fiery lake is one of the dangers Lemminkäinen faces. Lemminkäinen at the River of Fire by Akseli Gallen-Kallela (1920).

Details depend on the region and version of the song. In a version from Sotkamo, luonnottaret tell Lemminkäinen not to go to Pohjola (reason for the journey is not given) but he goes anyway, challenging the Lord and/or Lady of Pohjola to a sword fight after being given snake beer, emerging victorious. In a version from Hyrynsalmi, he goes to Vuotola/Väinälä to meet his sister and her husband despite the dangers. Lord of Vuotola tells him not to come in if he does not possess shamanistic magic and then offers him the snake beer, which he drinks. In a version from Ristijärvi, Lemminkäinen goes to Vuotola to meet his brother and arrives at Koppola, where the Lady of Lietola offers him snake beer. He drinks it after fishing the snakes out of the pint. In Nilsiä, Lemminkäinen challenges the son of Pohjola to a sword fight, receiving a maiden from the Court of Pohjola as his prize. In Kainuu, Lemminkäinen's shamanistic skills are mentioned under the name Kaukomieli, a hybrid-hero who often gets mixed with Lemminkäinen in runic songs. The snake beer and sword fight scenario is also sometimes mentioned as Väinämöinen's feat, for example when Louhi agrees to become a wife for Väinämöinen if he drinks the snake beer.

Multiple versions also exist from Karelia, similarly describing Lemminkäinen heading for a divine banquet he was not invited to and his mother warning him of the dangers on the way. In some versions, he is welcomed as a son-in-law and given regular beer. In versions originating from Loimola, Lemminkäinen's shamanistic magic is emphasized over his sword, as he is the best runic singer at the banquet and wins over Ahti in a shamans' battle.

=== Death of Lemminkäinen ===
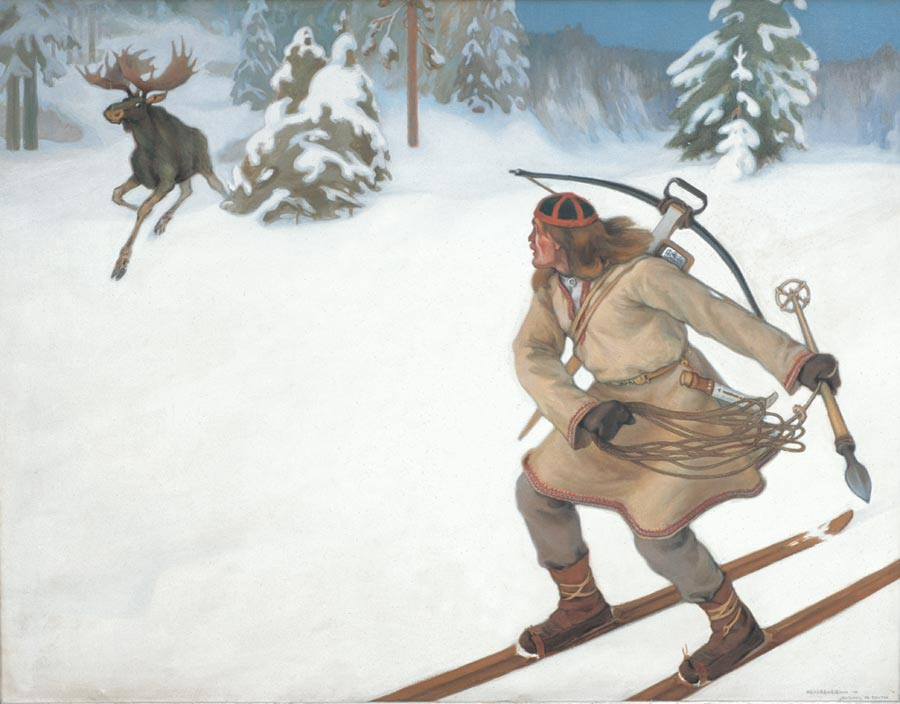
The Ski Hunt of the Moose of Hiisi by Väinö Hämäläinen (1902)

Near the Finnish-Russian border in White Karelia, Ilomantsi, Kesälahti and Kerimäki, the runic song Death of Lemminkäinen (Lemminkäisen surma) is known. In it, Lemminkäinen goes on a dangerous journey similar to that in the Song of Lemminkäinen, but with the goal of finding a bride. The destination of his journey could be Pohjola, Tuonela, Hiitola or Sápmi. His mother warns him not to go, as there are many shamans at his destination. He asks the mistress of the house for a maiden, but she tells him to clear various tasks before she would agree. These include hunting the Elk of Hiisi, which Lemminkäinen is able to do after praying for help from Ukko. He is then told to shoot a swan, which he goes to do, but while he is at it, the mistress kills him and dismembers his body.

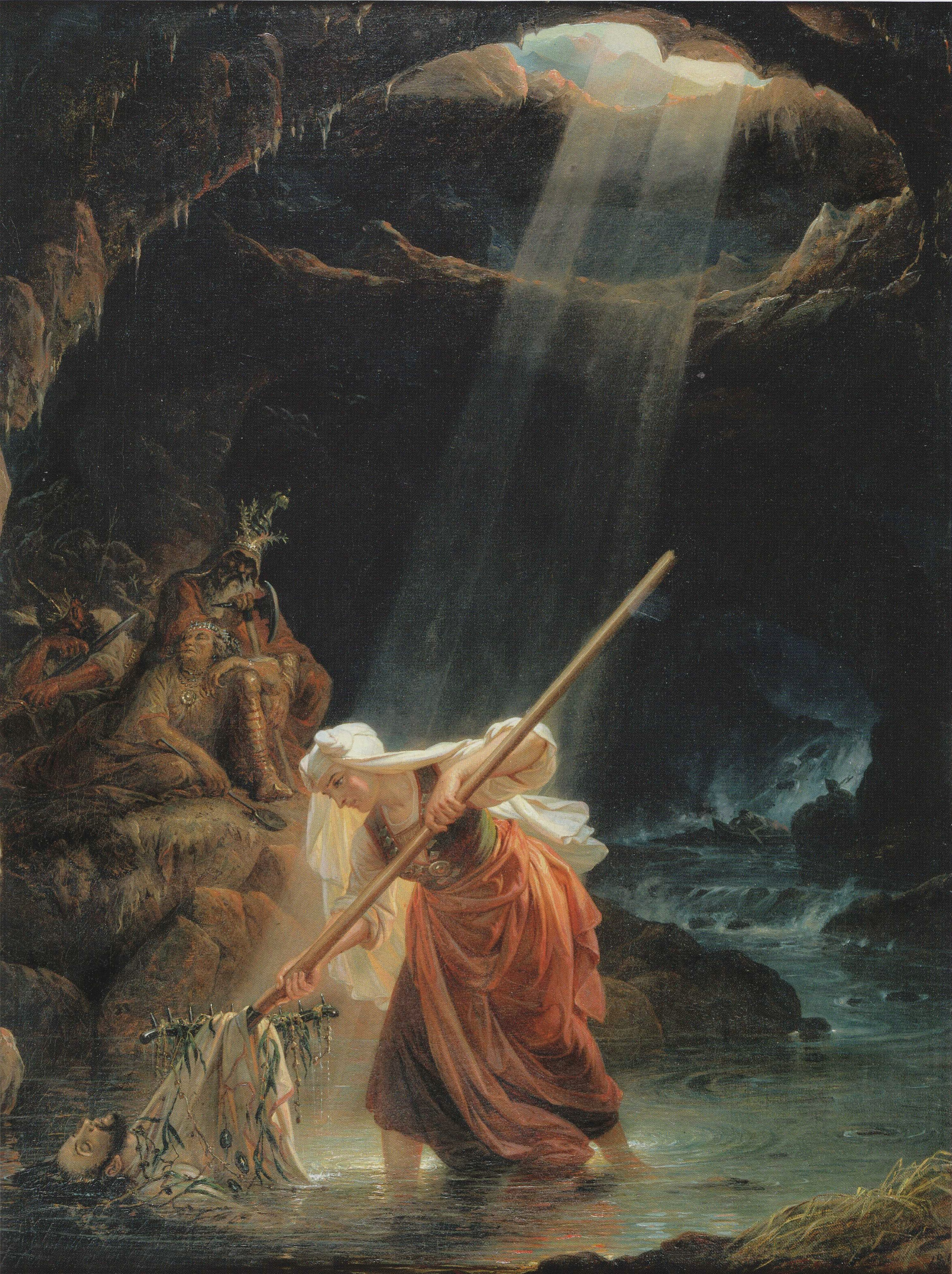
Lemminkäinen's Mother at Tuonela by Robert Wilhelm Ekman (1862)

Lemminkäinen's mother knows her son has died when she sees a hairbrush bleeding. She transforms into a bird and travels over nine seas looking for her son. Eventually, she finds him dismembered in water and picks up his body parts with a rake, putting him back together and resurrecting him. Some versions emphasize that the river where Lemminkäinen was dismembered was the river of Tuonela. There are also versions where the resurrection fails, Lemminkäinen's body stating his final words, typical for a shaman stuck on the other side: "My place is known, a bad place in the hard arms of death. My mother, I will no longer become a man, one already rotten cannot become a man".

There are also versions where Lemminkäinen is killed by Väinämöinen for his evil deeds, or by a "wet-hat cowboy" who Lemminkäinen has failed to enchant.

Matti Kuusi thought the Death of Lemminkäinen was a later remake of the Song of Lemminkäinen born in the Savonian expansion area, but Siikala pointed out that the themes of resurrection are very old motifs.

=== Song of Vipunen ===
In Karelia, Lemminkäinen is often called a son of Kaleva, but in Kainuu, South Karelia and White Karelia, he is called the son of Antero Vipunen. The runic song Song of Vipunen (Vipusen virsi) describes Väinämöinen's journey to the underworld to seek knowledge from the dead shaman Vipunen; but, according to Kuusi, Lemminkäinen is the original protagonist of this story, shaman son visiting his dead shaman father in the underworld. In Kainuu, fire is also called the son of Vipunen but created by Päivätär. In some versions of the Song of Vipunen, the dead shaman himself is called with the name Lemminkäinen.

=== Disease of Osmi ===
In the Estonian runic song Disease of Osmi (Osmi haigus), Lemming's father Osmi is sick for seven summers, eight springs and ten winters. His bed rots, he is buried, and herbs grow on his grave. There is an attempt of awaken him from his grave.

=== Song of Kaukamoinen ===
Lemminkäinen's story got strongly mixed with the story of a Viking Age hero named Kaukamoinen or Kaukomieli. In White Karelia, Kaukamoinen also possesses shaman's abilities like Lemminkäinen. Earliest mentions of Kaukamoinen are from Ostrobothnia in the 1700s, as a runic song written down by Christfried Ganander that mentioned Ahti, Kauko and Veitikka getting drunk at a banquet in Saariala. A clearest version of the Song of Kaukamoinen (Kaukamoisen virsi) separate from Lemminkäinen can be found from Ingria. As with Lemminkäinen, the location of the banquet depends on the song, but Kaukamoinen attends a banquet with Veitikka (sometimes including Ahti or a "son of Kalervikko"). He was not invited to join this banquet because of his frivolous way of life, but from seeing others going there while he was plowing a field of snakes and deciding to join in. The men get drunk and someone pours beer on Kaukamoinen's cape, angering him. This ends in a fight where Kaukamoinen ends up killing the man who spilled the beer, the host of the banquet.

In an alternative take, Kaukamoinen goes to the banquet and asks to buy beer: this is offensive towards the hosts of the banquet. Osmotar explains that all the beer has already been drunk, but as Kaukamoinen keeps insisting, a beer full of snakes is brought to him. Kaukamoinen drinks the beer and curses its server into the underworld. He is offended at not being given the finest seat at the banquet and continues to insult the hosts. His aunt's son Veitikka rises to defend the honour of the house, and the two end up in a sword fight where Kaukamoinen kills Veitikka. He escapes, not following his mother's advice to hide in the forest as his father had done but hiding on an island (Saari) by the coast of Finland instead. In some White Karelian versions, Ahti chases after Kaukamoinen while transformed into a kokko eagle.

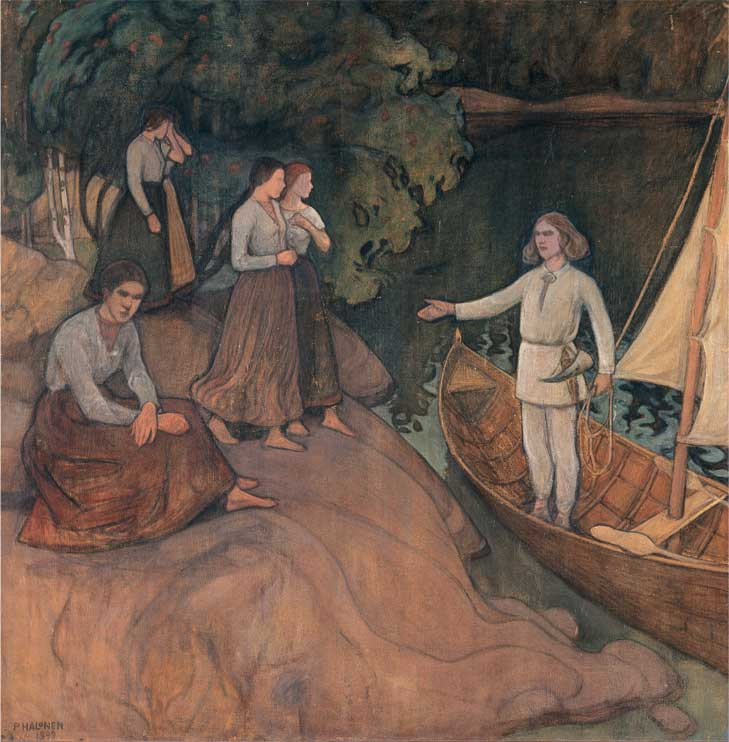
The Departure of Lemminkäinen from Saari by Pekka Halonen (1899)

The island is full of women that Kaukamoinen abuses in many ways while spending the next six years on the island. He has to escape the island as well when an old woman chases him off and curses his boat to hit the rocks. Kaukamoinen's mother knows something is up when a dog starts barking and her handkerchief turns bloody, and she forges an iron rake to save her son from the water. He complains about having had to lie in water for a week, but she simply responds with: "Without your mother, you'd have lain there for one more".

=== Ahti Saarelainen ===
In White and Olonets Karelia, there is a song dubbed the Rune of Ahti and Kyllikki (Finnish: Ahdin ja Kyllikin runo). The protagonist of the story is a man named Ahti Saarelainen (pronounced [ˈsɑːrelɑi̯nen], 'Islander'). He, too, is sometimes mixed with Lemminkäinen. Sometimes Ahti, Kauko and Veitikka are three separate characters, but sometimes their names are treated like alternatives for the same person. Ahti lives on an island called Saari ('Island'), and is sometimes even called its king.

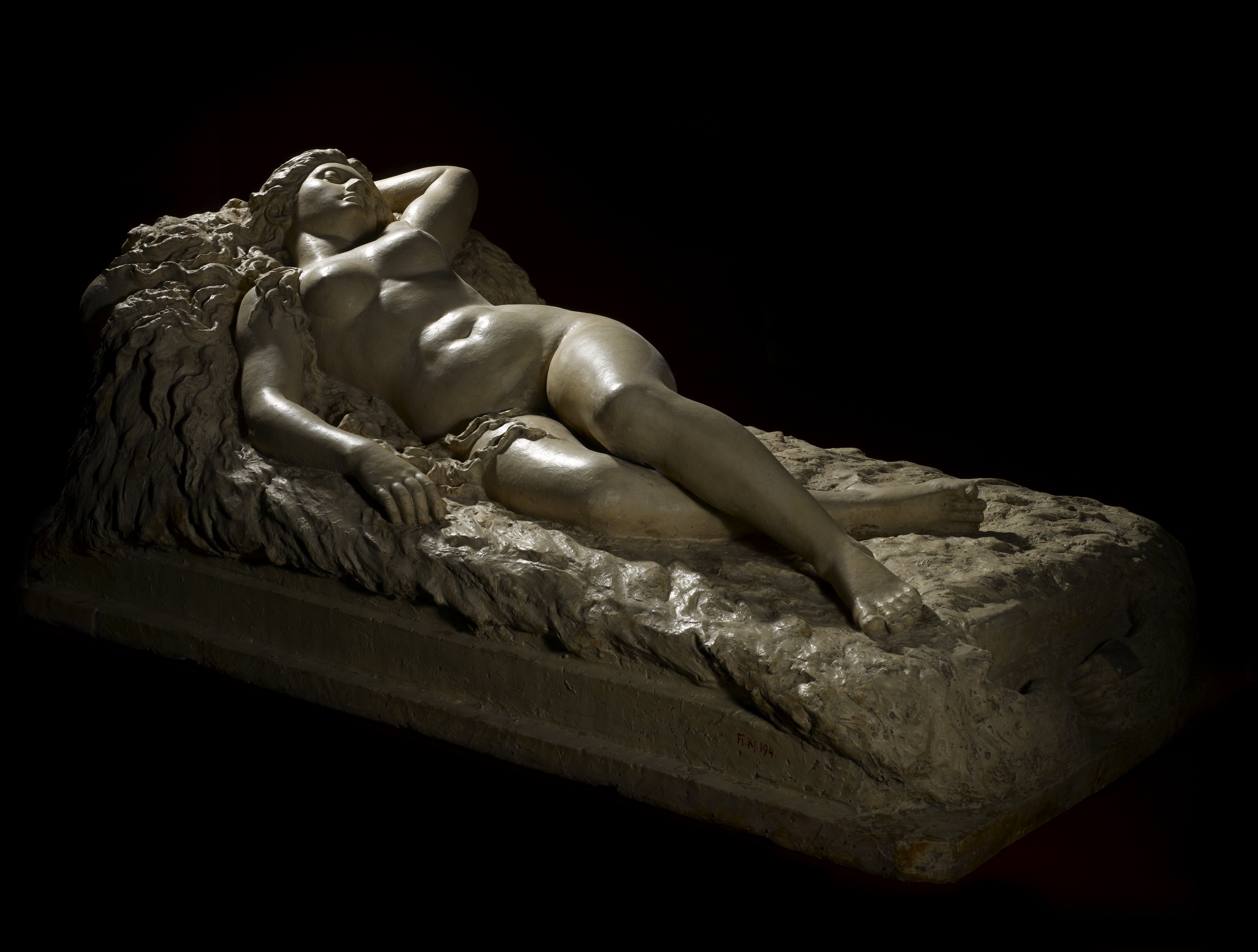
Kyllikki by Carl Eneas Sjöstrand (1883)

Ahti Saarelainen is described as a fierce seagoing warrior. He makes a double vow with his wife Kyllikki, binding him to stay at home and not to engage in raiding, and binding her to stay faithful. However, Kyllikki breaks her oath and Ahti goes on a voyage with his old war companion, the newly-wed Teuri. The early arrival of winter stops the campaign, but the rest of the song is lost. In the Ingrian song Ahti's sea voyage (Ahdin meriretki), Ahti was raised in Finland and Kauko in Karelia, but they arrive at the same place and become like brothers. They go to Koporye to ask a man named Anterus to join their sea voyage, but Anterus's mother warns him he shouldn't. The rest of the song is lost.

Further more, North Savo and North Karelian songs mention a wealthy man named Ahti who promises to give treasure to the one who is able to wake up Sampsa Pellervoinen to make his fields fertile.

=== Other songs ===
A runic song from Kainuu dialect area in the historical Ostrobothnia province mentions that Lemminkäinen accompanied Väinämöinen when the latter had made his new boat, and rowed the boat for him. Another song from North Ostrobothnia calls sauna steam "Lemminkäinen's honeybread".

== Interpretations ==
Lemminkäinen was known to researchers in the 18th century. Christian Erici Lencqvist described Lemminkäinen as a young man and wondered if he was a member of spirits called menninkäiset. In 1786, Christfried Ganander described Lemmingäinen as the same as Lemmätär, a satyr in Lempo's family. In 1789, the description had changed: Mythologia Fennica calls him a strong rower who accompanied Väinämöinen and rowed his new boat. In 1853, Matthias Castrén stated that Lemminkäinen was a god made human, comparable to Norse Tyr while making similar connections between Väinämöinen and Odin, and Ilmarinen and Thor. He also pointed out the similarities between Lemminkäinen and Baldr's stories of death and resurrection.

Julius Krohn saw Lemminkäinen as Jesus, as a song describes Lemminkäinen giving "eyes to the unseeing". In 1906, Kaarle Krohn suggested that Lemminkäinen is connected to three, originally separate poems: 1) Son of the Sun goes to a banquet uninvited, gets killed and is attempted to be resurrected; 2) Lemminkäinen goes to visit relatives, is given snake beer and kills the one who offered it; and 3) Kaukamoinen goes to drink beer uninvited, ends up in a duel with another guest and attempts to escape. Siikala thought that 1) and 2) should be one and the same story and not separated. Kaarle Krohn also thought that both Lemminkäinen and Baldr are actually just Jesus, their stories being Christian legends at their core.

While Lemminkäinen's resurrection has been connected to Baldr, Siikala also drew connections to Freyr and Svipdagr from Grógaldr, Fjölsvinnsmál and Skírnismál. Freyr's journey to marry the maiden Gerðr might have been used as a ritual song in Norse fertility rites, and Siikala thought it possible that the Baltic Finnic songs of proposals were secular remnants of such myths. There are also similarities with the marriage myths connected to the Baltic sun goddess Saulė. Much like Lemming's father Osmi, Freyr was buried in a mount where snow always melted. His death was hidden and he was thought to live inside the mount and was worshipped.

In Ingria, there is a song where the "Son of the Sun" goes to marry a maiden from Tuonela, which could suggest an early connection between Lemminkäinen and the Son of the Sun. Iivar Kemppinen connected Lemminkäinen to the topics of love and fertility and pointed out that lemmen also means fire. Siikala connected this further to fire, as both fire and Lemminkäinen are called a "son of Vipunen" in some songs. As Vipunen is also called Viroinen, Siikala connected him to the fertility god Virankannos, drawing a connection between Lemminkäinen - Vipunen - Virankannos and the topics of fire, the Sun and fertility. Virankannos had already been connected to Freyr earlier by Uno Harva. Siikala thought that after the original fertility rite context of the Song of Lemminkäinen was forgotten, it and Vipunen got connected to shamanistic tietäjä themes, gaining new meanings. Kuusi also considered "shaman epics" a relatively recent tradition.

When Lemminkäinen's resurrection fails, he can be seen as a representation of a shaman who spent too long in trance to be able to return to the world of the living. Similar story among Sámi is the story of the shaman Akmeeli, under his Christian name Antereeus, who has also been connected to Antero Vipunen.

Much like Lemminkäinen, Loki arrived uninvited to a banquet in Lokasenna. His resurrection has also been connected to Osiris. Martti Haavio was convinced that elements of the Egyptian myth had truly travelled to the Uralic region through Byzantium and Russia, for example through the bylina Vavilo i skomorokhi. Juha Pentikäinen, on the other hand, has found this theory "far-fetched".

The Song of Kaukamoinen has been connected to some Russian bylinas, such as Dobrynya and the dragon, and Khoten Bludovich.

== Epithets ==
Epithet	Epithet meaning	Regions
Lieto Lemminkäinen	'Frivolous Lemminkäinen'	Kainuu, Ladoga Karelia, North Karelia, North Ostrobothnia, North Savo, Olonets Karelia, White Karelia
Luottehikas Lemminkäinen; Lemminkäinen luottehinen Lohtehikko Lemminkinen	'Lemminkäinen with many luotteet'	Kainuu, Karelian Isthmus, White Karelia
Virsikäs Vipusen poika	'Son of Vipunen, possessing a lot of (magic) songs'	Kainuu, Karelian Isthmus, White Karelia
(Kaunis) Kalevan poika	'(Beautiful) son of Kaleva'	North Karelia, Olonets Karelia, White Karelia
Laulaja iänikuinen	'Eternal singer'	White Karelia
Tallermaa kuningas	'King of Tallinn'	Harju, Lääne-Viru
Lemmik leinä poisikõnõ	'Lemmik, son of sorrow'	Setomaa

== In the Kalevala ==
In one myth, he drowns in the river of Tuonela (the underworld) in trying to capture or kill the black swan that lives there as part of an attempt, as Ilmarinen once made, to win a daughter of Louhi as his wife. In a tale somewhat reminiscent of Isis' search for Osiris, Lemminkäinen's mother searches heaven and earth to find her son. Finally, she learns of his fate and asks Ilmarinen to fashion her a rake of copper with which to dredge her son's body from the river of Tuonela. Thus equipped, she descends into the underworld in search of her son. On the banks of the river of the underworld, she rakes up first Lemminkäinen's tunic and shoes, and then, his maimed and broken body. Unrelenting, she continues her work until every piece of Lemminkäinen's body is recovered. Sewing the parts together and offering prayers to the gods, the mother tries to restore Lemminkäinen to life, but while she succeeds in remaking his body, his life is still absent. Then, she entreats a bee to ascend to the halls of the over-god Ukko and fetch from there a drop of honey as ointment that would bring Lemminkäinen back to life. Only with such a potent remedy is the hero finally restored.

One of the challenges Lemminkäinen faced was a character named Surma. Surma was a terrible beast which embodied sudden, violent death and guarded the gates of the Tuonela to prevent escape. Surma is often described as being a large dog with a snake-tail that can turn people into stone (with a stare). An often-used Finnish metaphor is surman suuhun "into Surma's mouth", as if the victim was mauled to death by Surma.

In the Kalevala, the compiler Elias Lönnrot conflated several mythological persons into the main characters in an attempt to create a consistent narrative from several songs. The heroic figures Kaukomieli and Ahti were condensed into Lemminkäinen in the work. Ahti's story is of a man so eager to fight that he abandons his young wife and sets out on an adventure with his friend Tiera. The original songs in the Ahti cycle have been tentatively dated to the Viking Age because of their references to sea voyages, but Oinas also sees an adventurous element in both Ahti and Kaukamoinen's tales.

In the Kalevala, Ahti is mentioned (as a synonym of Lemminkäinen) in Rune IX, where his close association with the sea is made clear; in this verse his marriage to Kyllikki, and their vows, are described. Rune XII describes Kyllikki's breaking of her vow. In Rune XX Ahti is briefly mentioned, and the conflation with Lemminkäinen and Kaukomieli is made explicit.

Ahti is also mentioned in Rune XXVI, in Rune XXVIII he is called "Ahti, hero of the Islands", and in Rune XXX he is again identified with Lemminkäinen. A pattern of association of the name "Ahti" with islands and seafaring is found in Runes XX, XXVI, XXVII, XXVIII, and other runes.

== Lemminkäinen in arts ==
Lemminkäinen is the subject of the four-part "Lemminkäinen Suite" by Jean Sibelius, and of an overture by Väinö Haapalainen, both of them Finnish composers.

Parts of the story of Lemminkäinen and Kullervo are used by Elizabeth Goudge (1900-1984) in her 1938 play Suomi, one of her Three Plays: Suomi; The Brontës of Haworth; Fanny Burney (Gerald Duckworth, 1939). Goudge's modern play, set in 1899, 1917 and 1918, has modern characters, fighting for Finnish independence from Tsarist Russia. These include "Suomi", the mother, nicknamed after the Finnish word for "Finland", and her sons, Olof and Kyosti. Olof, a version of Lemminkäinen, marries a Russian woman, and is killed by his enemies, but seemingly resurrected in his son, Sigurd. Kyosti, a version of Kullervo, kills Sigurd, and then commits suicide. Goudge's play includes quotes from the Kalevala and Sibelius's Finlandia.

The 2007 album (Silent Waters) of Finnish metal band Amorphis is about the story of Lemminkäinen.

The 2008 song (River of Tuoni) by Finnish metal band Amberian Dawn is about Lemminkäinen's mother's search for him in the river of Tuoni.

Lemminkäinen appears as Lemminkal Heikkinen the Warrior-Mage in Mercedes Lackey's 500 Kingdoms Series' homage to Sámi, among other Scandinavian and northern European myths and legends, The Snow Queen (2008).

The 2018 song The Bee by Finnish metal band Amorphis also references the story of Lemminkäinen and of the bee entrusted by his mother to retrieve honey from the halls of the over-god Ukko.

Lemminkäinen is the protagonist of the 1959 Soviet–Finnish film Sampo and its American adaptation, The Day the Earth Froze.

The Dungeons & Dragons character Mordenkainen is partially named after him.

== Lemminkäinen in films ==
- (in English) "Back to Lemminkäinen" – (Documentary Series, 2020)

== Gallery ==
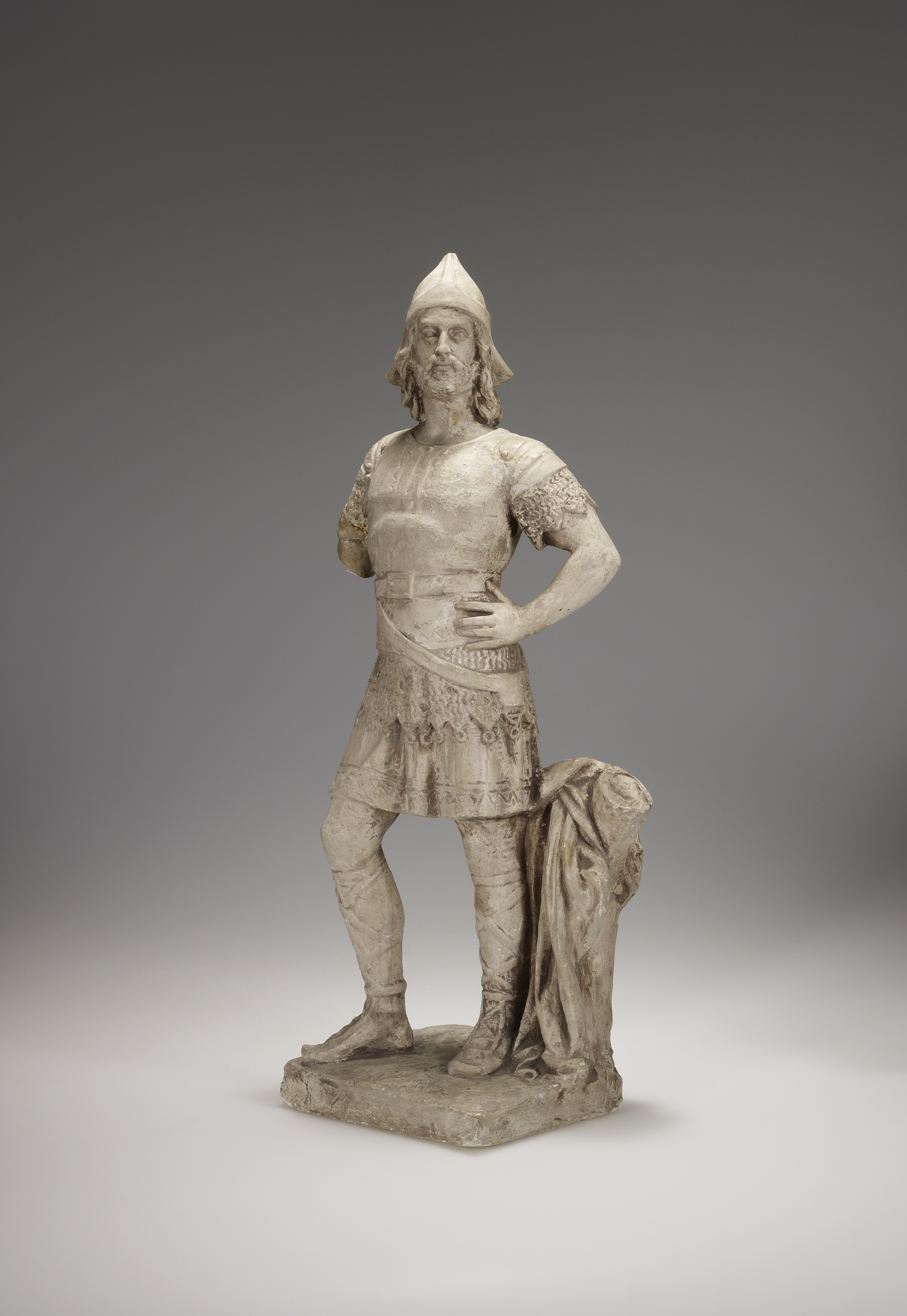
Lemminkäinen, Carl Eneas Sjöstrand, 1872

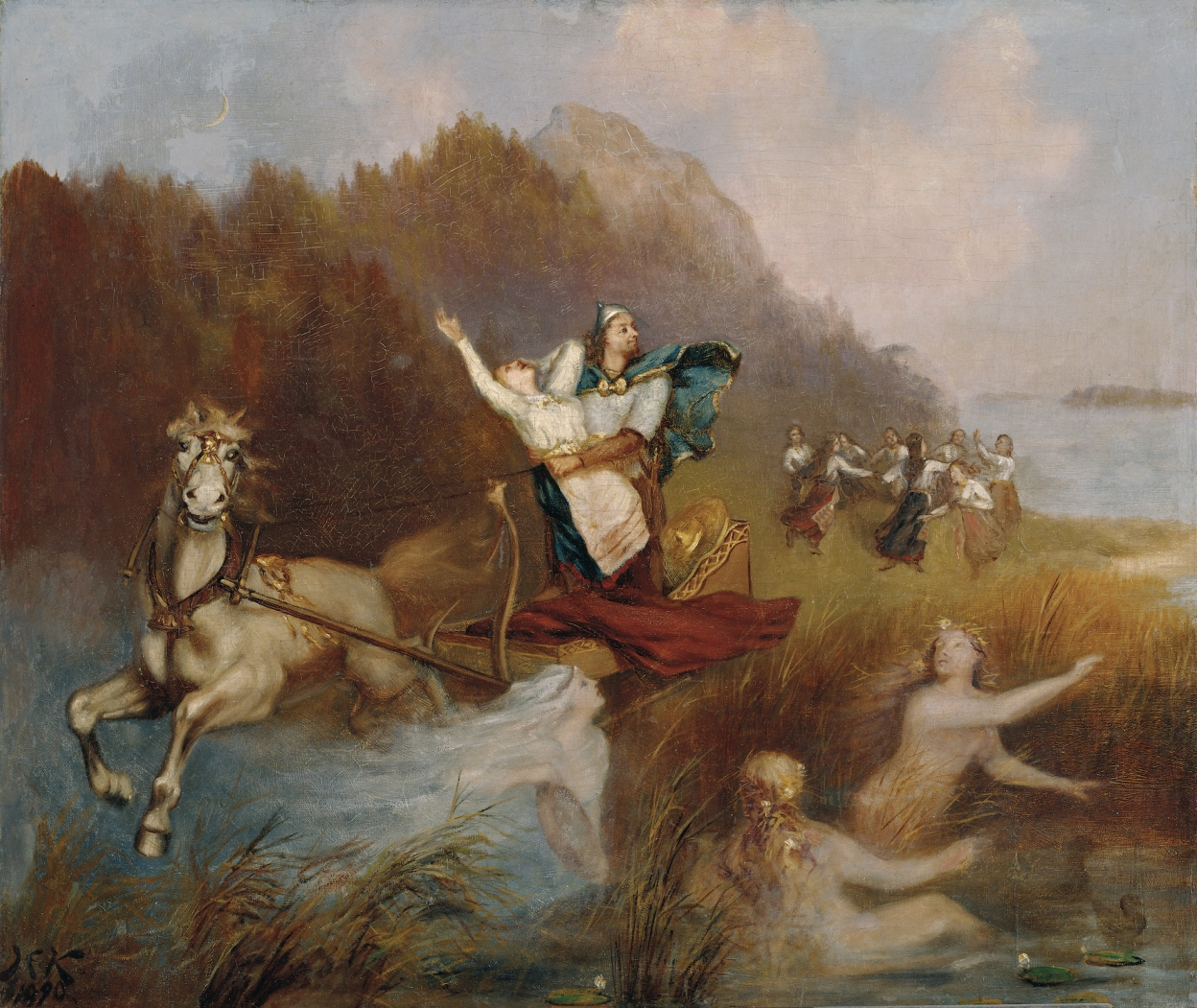
Abduction of Kyllikki, Johan Kortman, 1890

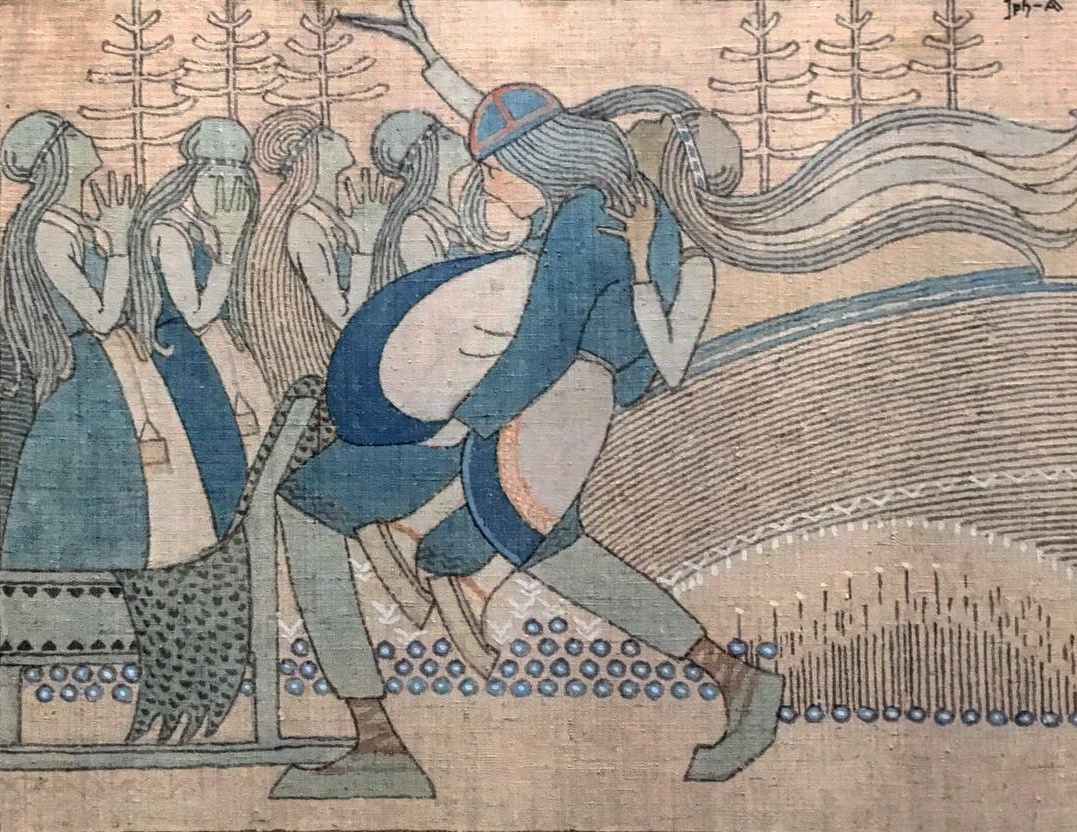
Abduction of Kyllikki, Joseph Alanen, 1916–1917

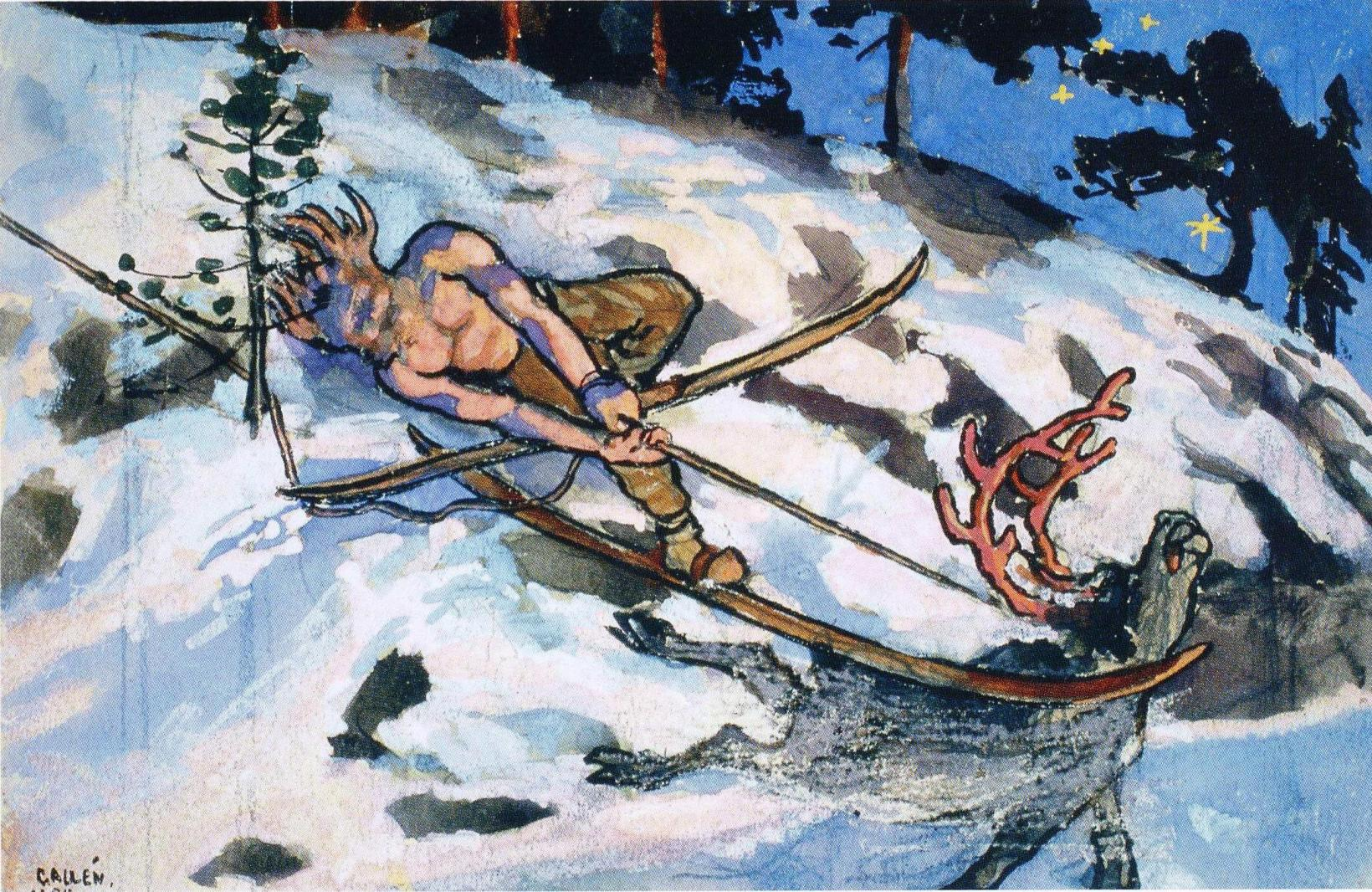
The Chase of the Moose of Hiisi, Akseli Gallen-Kallela, 1894

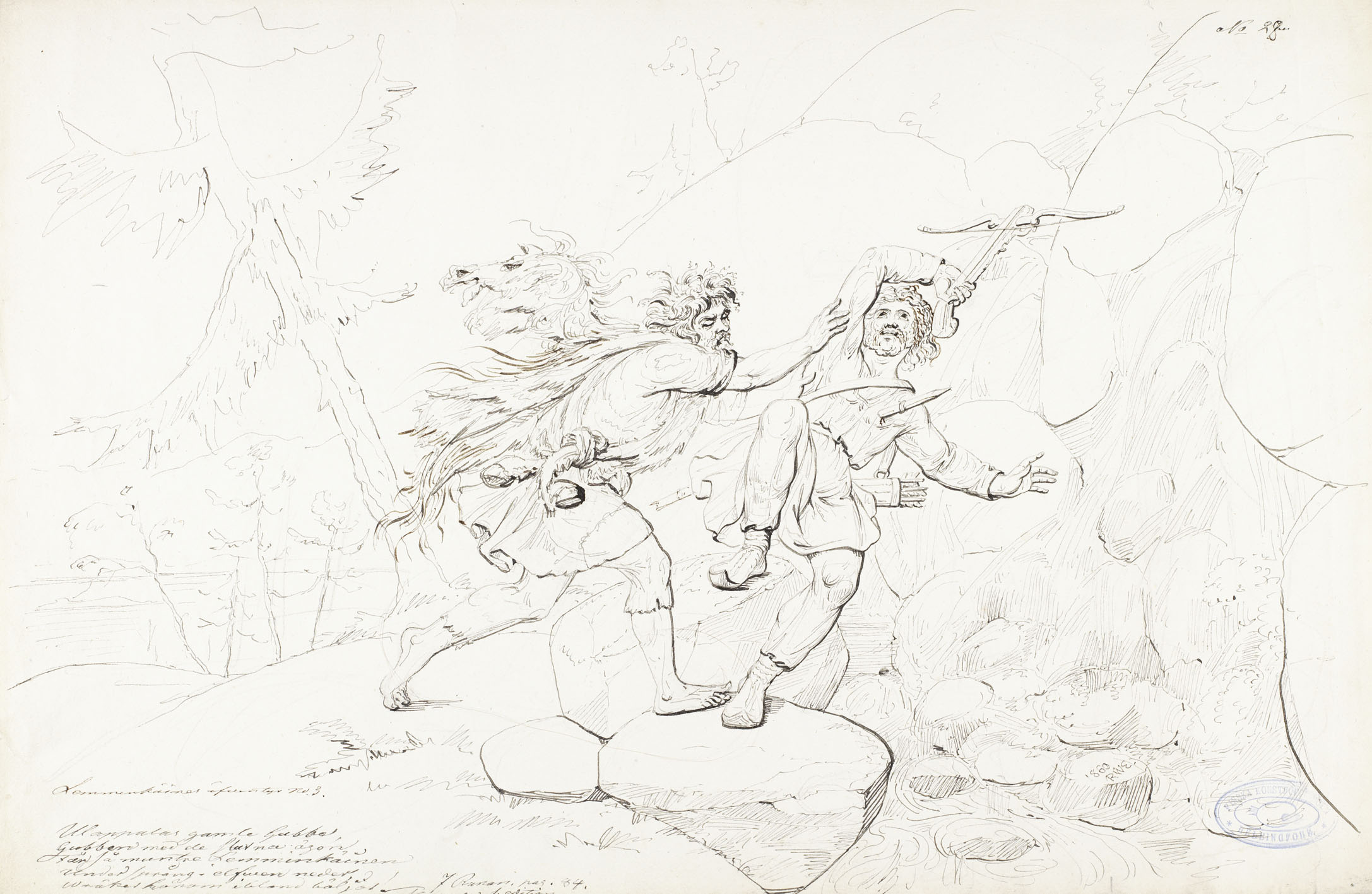
The Death of Lemminkäinen, Robert Wilhelm Ekman, 1860

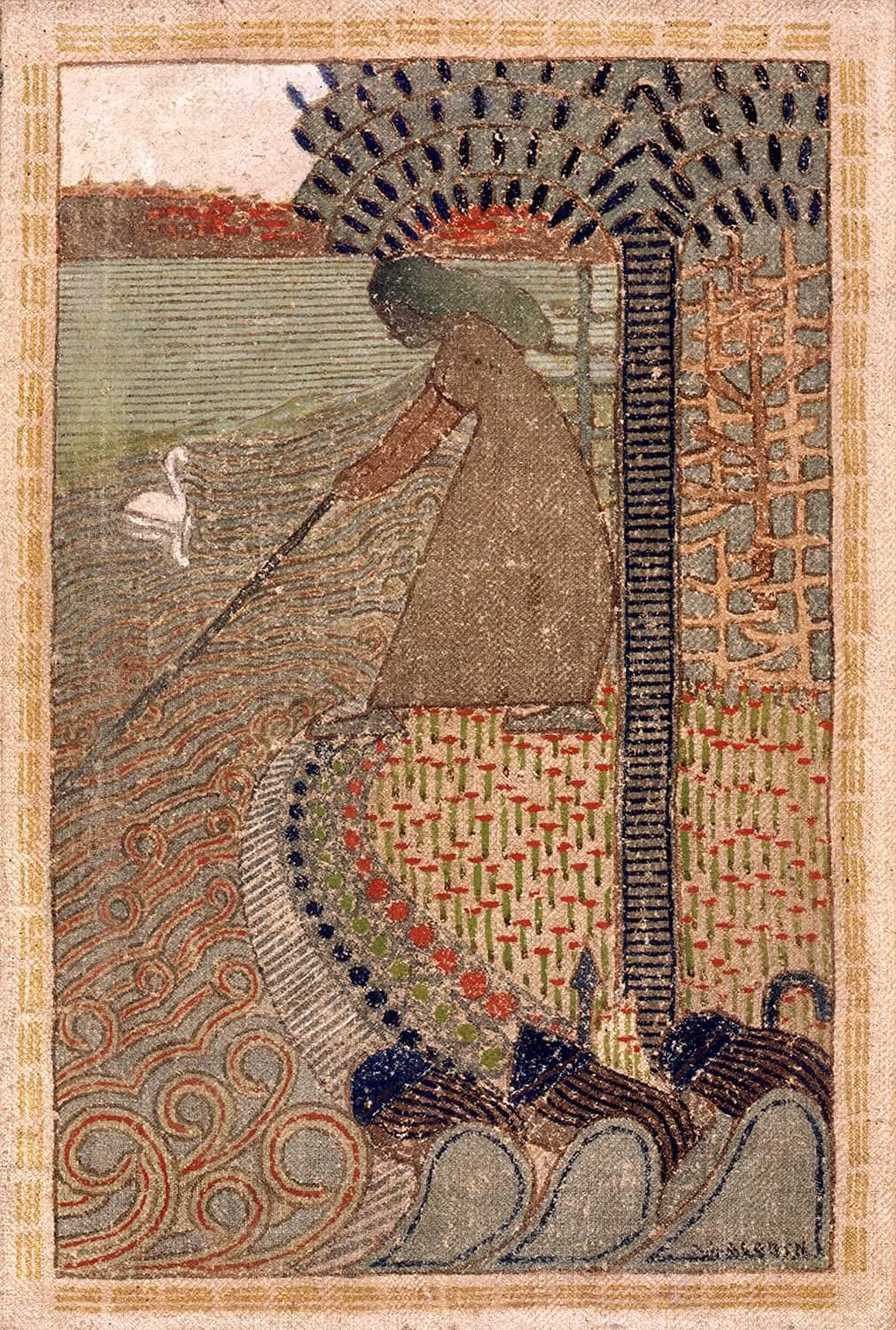
Lemminkäinen's Mother at the River of Tuonela, Joseph Alanen, 1908–1911

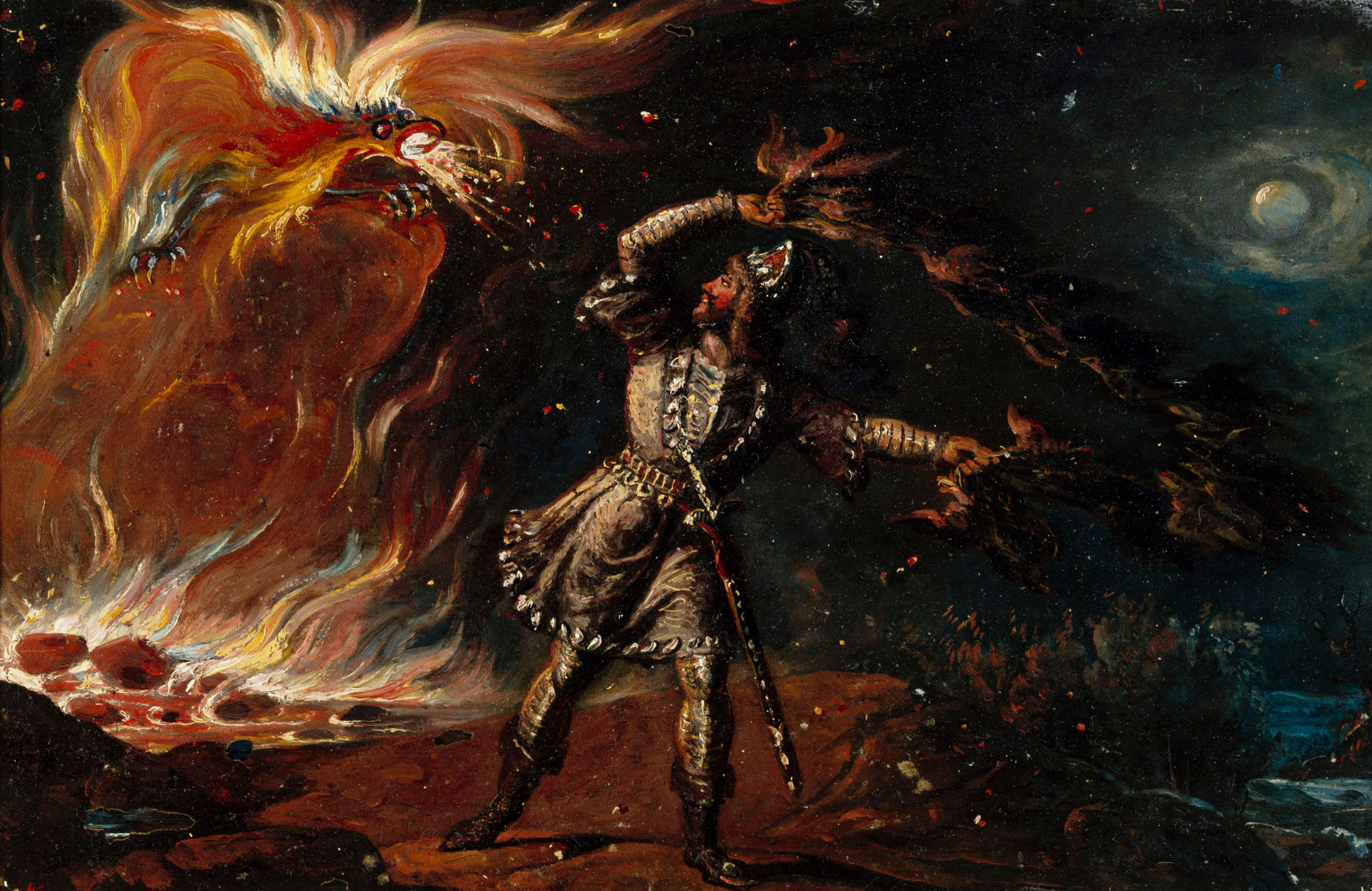
Lemminkäinen and the Fiery Eagle, Robert Wilhelm Ekman, 1867

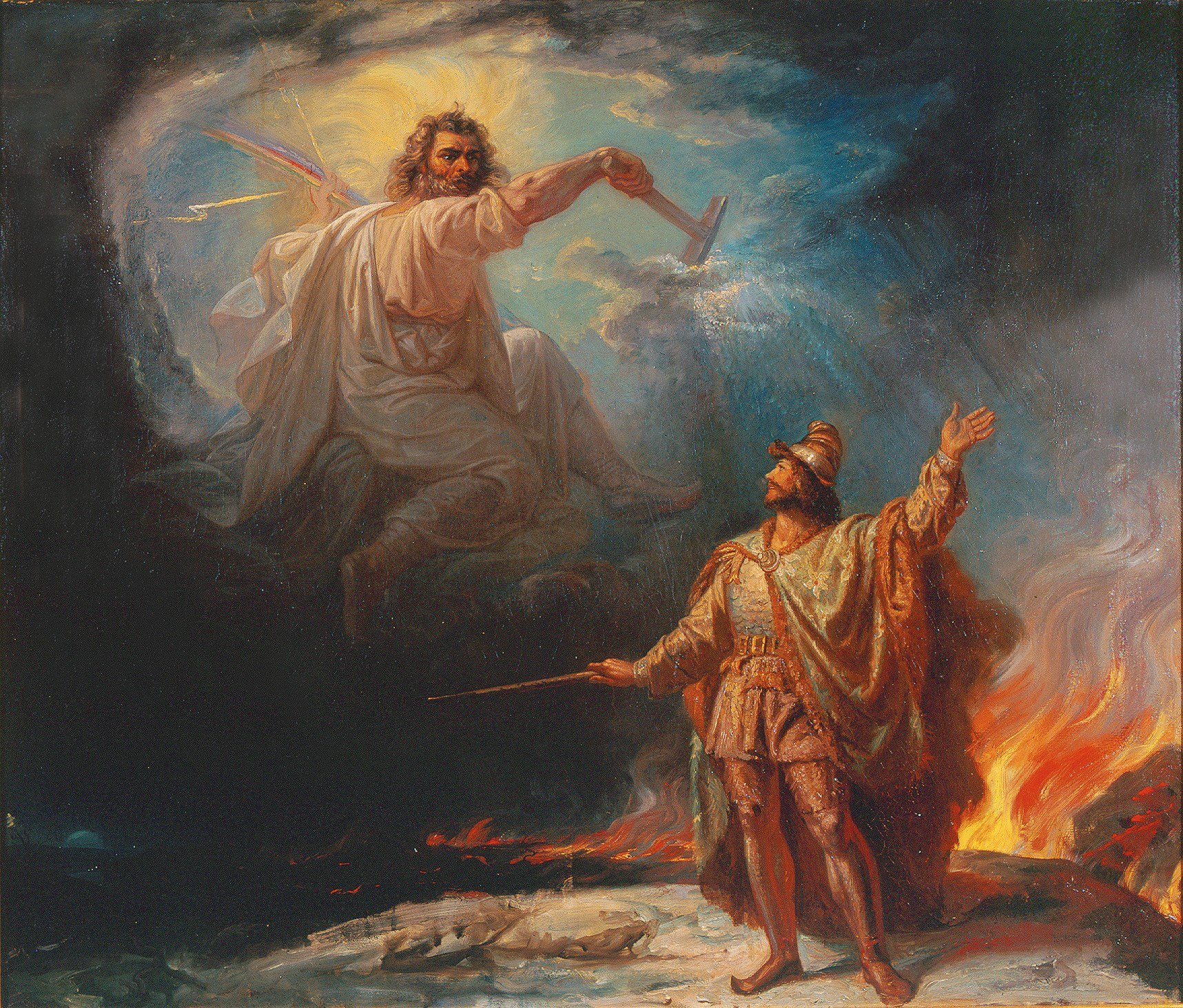
Lemminkäinen at the Fiery Lake, Robert Wilhelm Ekman, c. 1867, depicting the call for help from Ukko

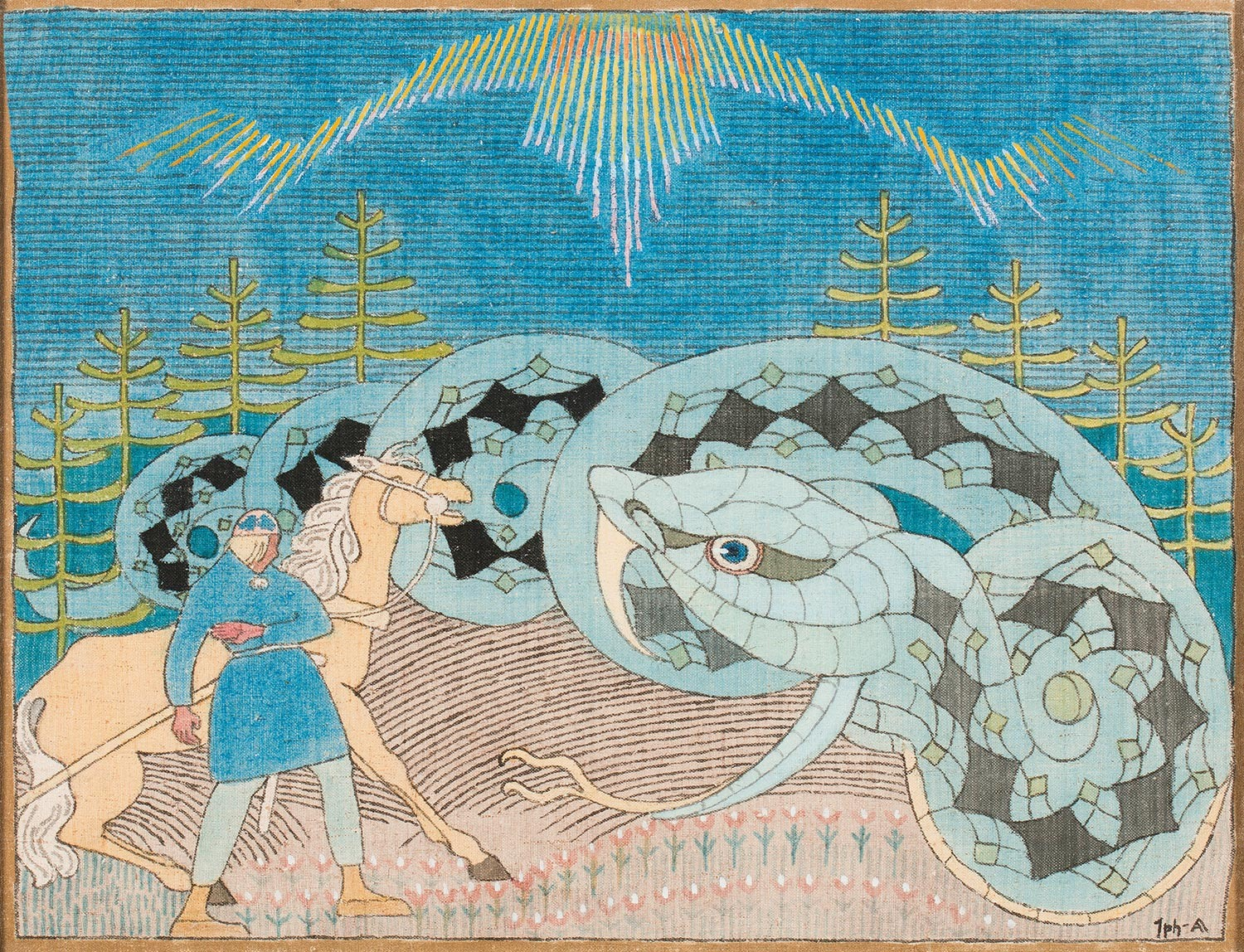
Lemminkäinen and the Great Snake, Joseph Alanen, 1919–1920

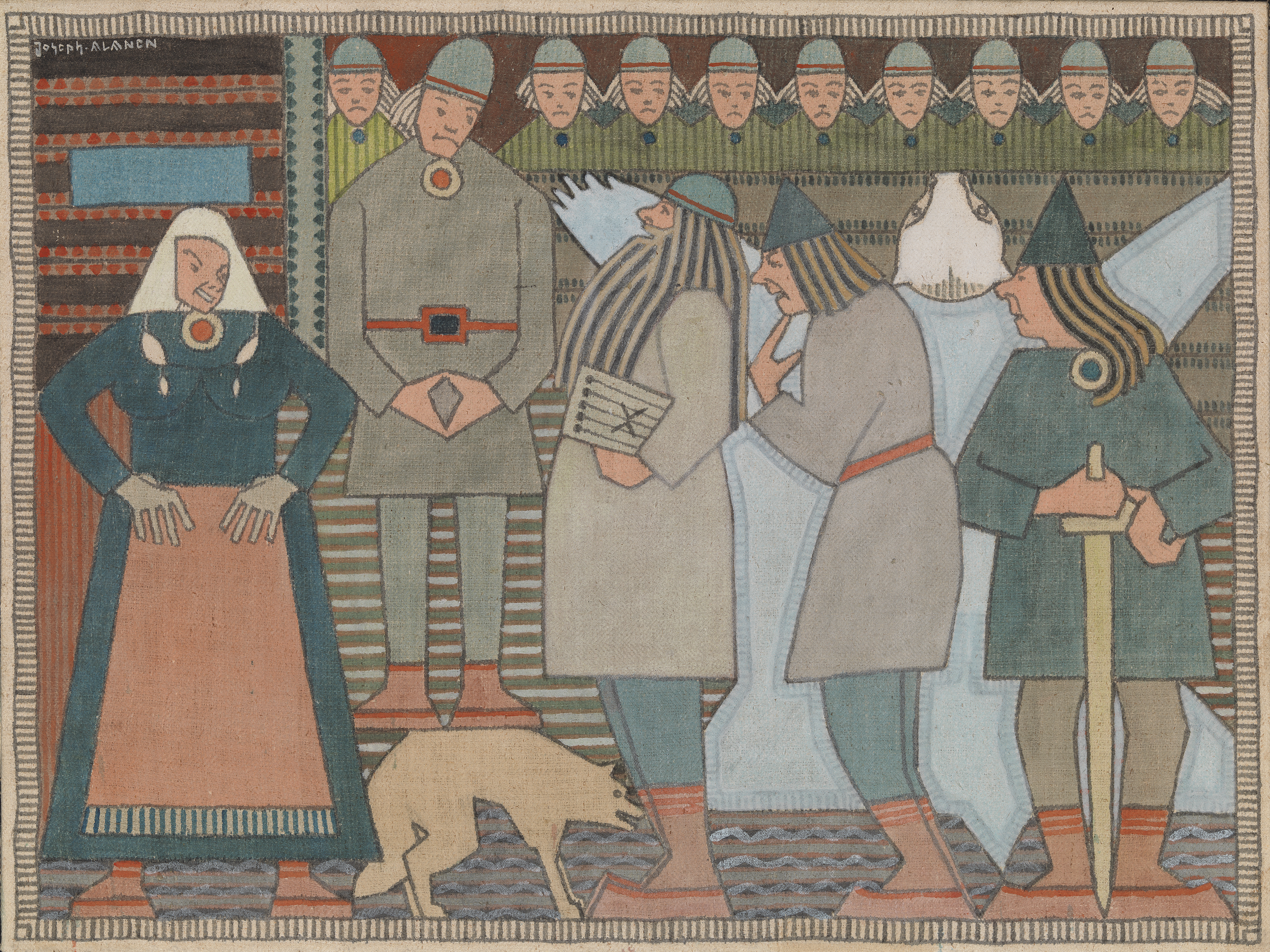
Arrival of Väinämöinen, Ilmarinen and Lemminkäinen at Pohjola, tempera by Joseph Alanen

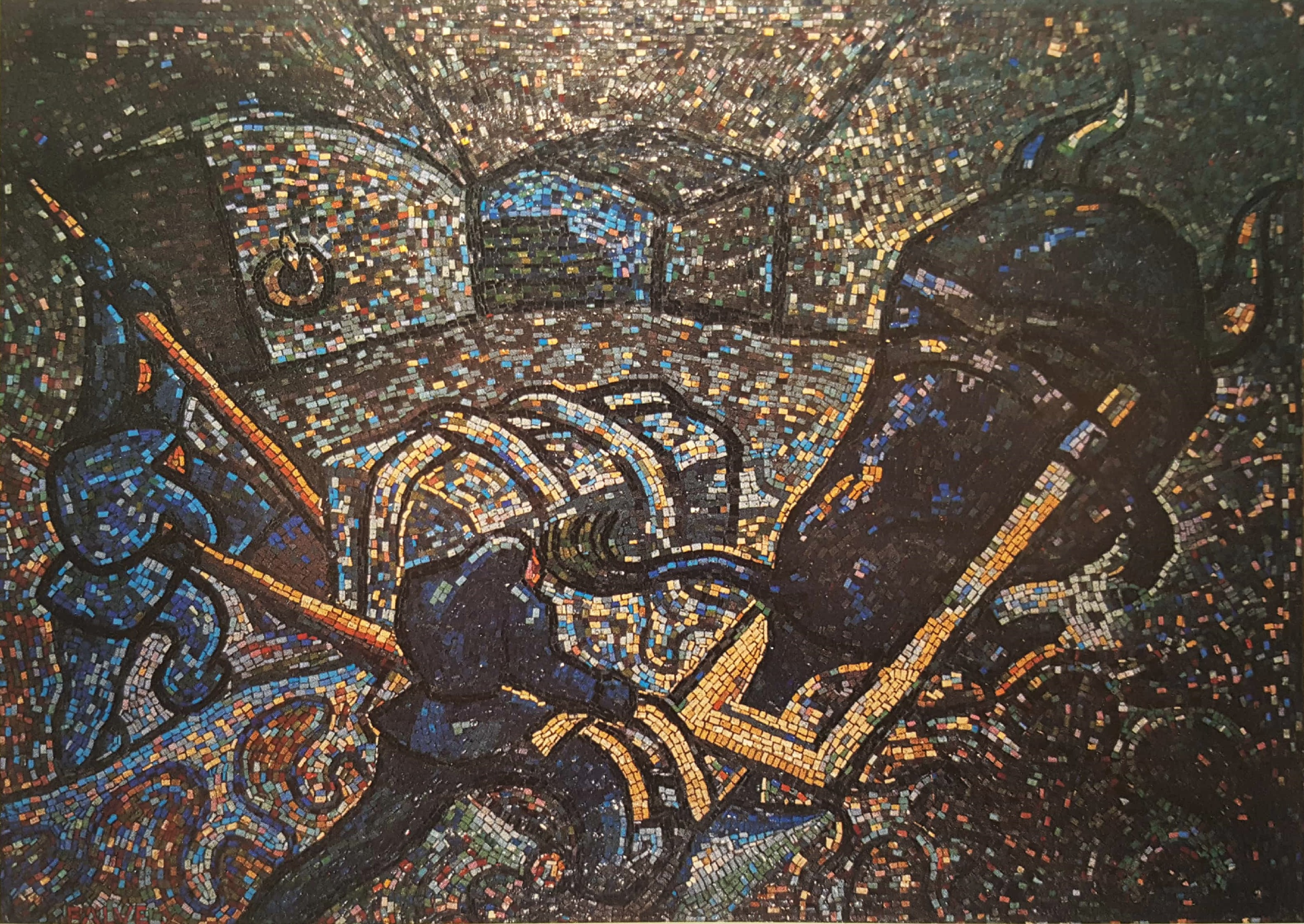
The Retrieval of Sampo from the Stone Hill of Pohjola, where Lemminkäinen ploughs the roots with a Pohjola bull, mosaic by Veikko Aaltona, 1940

== See also ==
- Baldr
- Temple of Lemminkäinen

== Sources ==
- Ganander, Christfried (1789), Mythologia Fennica, Turku
- Haavio, Martti (1967), Suomalainen mytologia, WSOY, ISBN 978-951-858-026-6
- Honko, Lauri, ed. (1990), Religion, Myth and Folklore in the World's Epics: The Kalevala and its Predecessors, Mouton de Gruyter
- Krohn, Kaarle (1914), Suomalaisten runojen uskonto, Porvoo: WSOY and Finnish Literature Society
- Kuusi, Matti (1975), Kansanruno-Kalevala, Helsinki: Otava, ISBN 951-1-01969-4
- Pentikäinen, Juha (1987). "Kalevala Mythology, Revised Edition". Google Books (originally Indiana University Press).
- Pulkkinen, Risto (2014), Suomalainen kansanusko, Gaudeamus, ISBN 978-952-495-340-5
- Siikala, Anna-Leena (1992), Suomalainen šamanismi, Finnish Literature Society, ISBN 978-951-858-169-0
- Siikala, Anna-Leena (2012), Itämerensuomalaisten mytologia, Finnish Literature Society, ISBN 978-952-222-393-7
