= Tiera =

Character in the Finnish epic Kalevala

Tiera is a name which appears in Finnish mythology and Finnish and Karelian runic songs. Multiple variations of the name exist. In some runic songs and the Kalevala, Tiera appears as a warrior.

== In runic songs ==
First written down runic song mention of a similar name is from 1786, when a common lizard is called Iki-Tiitty äjjyn poika, / pääpuikko Panulan nejjen, / Syöjättären rintasolki 'Iki-Tiitty son of Äijy, / main stick of Panula's maiden, / brooch of Syöjätär', etc. Christfried Ganander called Iki-Tiitty the father of the common lizard.

In runic songs from Kainuu and White Karelia, Tiera appears in songs describing the origin of horses. He might give birth to a horse (out of sand and foam), or a horse itself might be called Hepo Tiera, Nieran poika, / Juuttaan äpäre-lapsi 'Horse Tiera son of Niera, bastard child of Judas'. In both regions, he is also called Äijön poika 'Äijö's son' or Äijön lapsi 'Äijö's child', Äijö typically referring to the Devil. In a White Karelian runic song, Iki Tiera Lieran poika 'eternal Tiera, son of Liera' is asked to help a horse's castrator.

In White Karelian songs sung by Arhippa Perttunen, Iku-Tiera is described as a warrior, a helper and friend of Väinämöinen, who accompanies him to steal the sampo from Pohjola. In White Karelian songs sung by many others, this helper is Vesiviitto, Väinön poika 'Water cape, son of Väinö' or Vesi Liito, Laito poika. A warrior named Teiri or Teuri appears as a friend of Ahti Saarelainen.

In North Karelia and North Ostrobothnia, epithets such as Hiki Tiera, mieron huora ('Sweat Tiera, whore of the world') refer to Louhi.

== Name and origins ==
Variations of Tiera's name include Niera, Liera, Ukotiera, Hikitiera, Ikutiera, Ikutihku, and Ikitiera. Martti Haavio further listed Iki Liera Tierän poika, Iku Tiira Niiran poika, Hiki-Kiera Mieran poika, Hiki Kieran Mieran poika, and Ipi-Tiera Lieran poika. Elias Lönnrot described Ikiliera as "one who is in constant motion", Ikutiera as "a man's name, meaning someone who is always travelling", and Iki-Tiitty would come from ikittää 'to stutter'.

Kaarle Krohn theorized the name came from Herodias, turning to Tiia and then Tiera. Later, he considered Tiera to be the illegitimate son of king Herod and Herodias, whose name would be a corruption of Judas's name Iscariot. Out of these two, Haavio found the former more likely. He considered Vesi-Liito to be the original name used in the sampo story instead of Iku-Tiera. The epithet Laitopoika would mean a travel boy or a waterway boy, and the name Vesiliito refers to liði, a hird man.

Later researchers, such as Harry Lönnroth and Martti Linna, have supported the theory that the names Tiera, Liera, and Niera are of Scandinavian origin. Mikko Heikkilä suggested that the name Kaleva came from Germanic *χᵃlewaz which later became Hlér in Old Norse. He further suggested that this name was loaned into Finnish for a second time, being the origin of Liera. Niera would've been loaned from Snær (personification of snow), and Tiera have morphed in runic songs from Torre, after Snær's son Þorri (personification of frost or winter), who appears as a mythic king of Finland. There are multiple place names with the name Torre in Western Finland, including Torren lähde 'Torre's spring' in Laitila which was, according to Hversu Noregr byggðist, a location of worship of the deity Þorri. Teuri, on the other hand, would come from a Scandinavian male name (meaning 'animal', like Runic Swedish male name TiuRi).

== In the Kalevala ==
In the Kalevala by Lönnrot, Tiera appears as a warrior and a friend of Lemminkäinen. He was made by combining Perttunen's Iku-Tiera in the theft of sampo with Ahti Saarelainen's (who Lönnrot combined with Lemminkäinen) friend Teuri. He is also referred to by the name Kuura 'frost'.
