= Antero Vipunen =

Figure in Finnish mythology

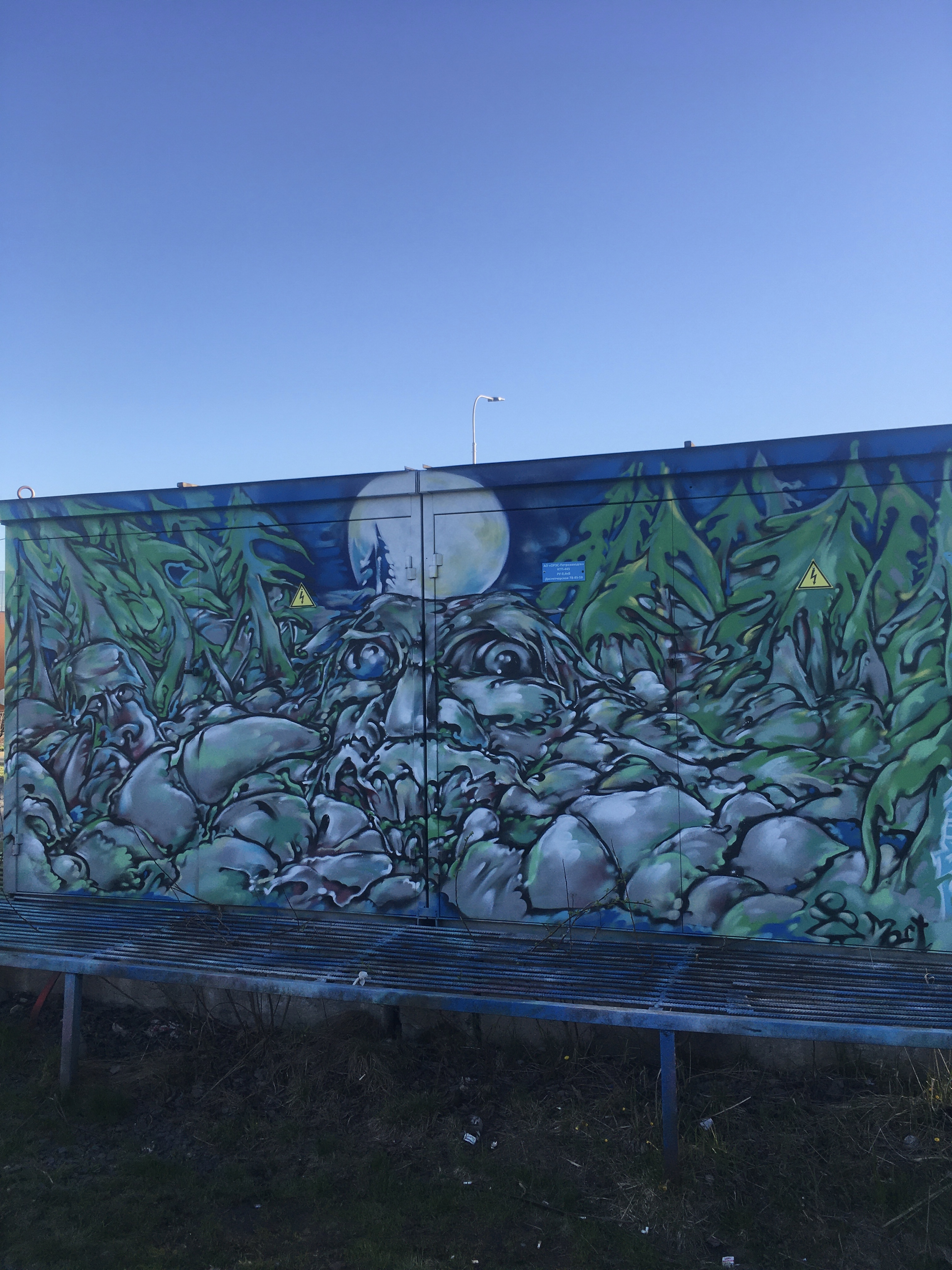
Vipunen in a graffiti in Petrozavodsk, Russia.

Antero Vipunen is a giant who appears in Finnish mythology and runic songs. He is buried underground and possesses very valuable spells and knowledge.

== In runic songs ==
Väinämöinen requires three magic words or luotteet to finish creating his boat and wants his brother Joukahainen to go get them from the legendary shaman Antero Vipunen. However, Joukahainen says that Vipunen is long since dead and buried. Väinämöinen proceeds to travel to the underworld to meet him, as he as a fellow shaman could: this journey could be described in ways such as "walking on men's swords and women's needles" or Väinämöinen's left foot being the first thing to sink when Väinämöinen falls into Vipunen's mouth. Inside Vipunen, Väinämöinen creates a forge and starts hammering, causing pain for Vipunen. He spits Väinämöinen out, giving him the words he needs.

In some versions, the protagonist is Lemminkäinen. According to Matti Kuusi, Lemminkäinen was likely the original protagonist instead of Väinämöinen. In some runic songs, Lemminkäinen, as well as fire, is called the son of Vipunen. In a South Savo version of the song, "wise Vintti lyyrätyinen" is missing two words when making a boat, and Väinämöinen tells him to go get them from Vipunen in the underworld. On the Karelian Isthmus, the protagonist is called a son of Vipunen.

== Name and interpretations ==
Alternate versions of Vipunen's name include Akervo, Angermo, Angero, Angervo, Ankervo, Ankerus, Anteli, Anterma, Anterus, Antervo, Kalkkini, Kanderva, Kantervo, Kavanteres, and Untelo.

Uno Harva theorized his name to come from Andrew the Apostle, whose cross would've been misinterpreted as a bird hunting trap (Finnish: vipuansa).

Näkkäläjärvi and Kauppala (2017, pp. 121-22) link him to Ikämieli (16th or 17th century) (also known as Akmeeli, Antereeus and Antero Vipunen) who was a Sámi shaman, wiseman and warlord who featured in many Finnish folktales. In these folktales, he might appear as a shaman who got stuck in a trance and died, which has also been theorized to be what lead Vipunen to his death. Vipunen would've been only seen as a giant after the shamanistic process of reaching the underworld became unclear for the runic singers.

Anna-Leena Siikala focused on other forms of his name in runic songs, which include Angervo 'Filipendula' and Viroinen. "Antero" she considered a later creation after the original name was forgotten. She connected him to the fertility god Virankannos and considered his myth to have originally been connected to a fertility cult, the shamanistic elements only having been added in later when the original context was forgotten. Eemil Nestor Setälä stated that the mysterious Vironvipu in Ingrian runic songs means the same as Virankannos: the world pillar. He guessed Vipunen's original first name could've been closest to the form Kanderva, related to the words kanta, kannas 'base, narrow connecting part, footboard'.

Kaarle Krohn believed Vipunen's original name began with U, as the name appears in South Savo in the form Untelo. He connected the name Viroinen to Estonian Virelemas, whose equivalent in Ingria "knows the Moon, the Sun, the stars, and the depths of the sea".

Martti Haavio connected Väinämöinen being swallowed by Vipunen as an example of the widespread myth of a hero being swallowed by a large fish, such as Jonah. In Sámi shamanism, Akmeeli or other shaman's soul that gets stuck to the other side is said to be inside the bowels of a pike. Väinämöinen ends up sailing inside the bowels of the Girl of Tuoni who swallows him in a White Karelian song. The Song of Vipunen could've also been influenced by the Olonets and Ladoga Karelian song in which Ilmarinen is swallowed by a "woman of hiisi" or Baba Yaga (Livvi: igä buabo) and frees himself by forging. Ilmarinen is the protagonist of the oldest known version of the Song of Vipunen, possibly written down in the 17th century.

== In the Kalevala ==
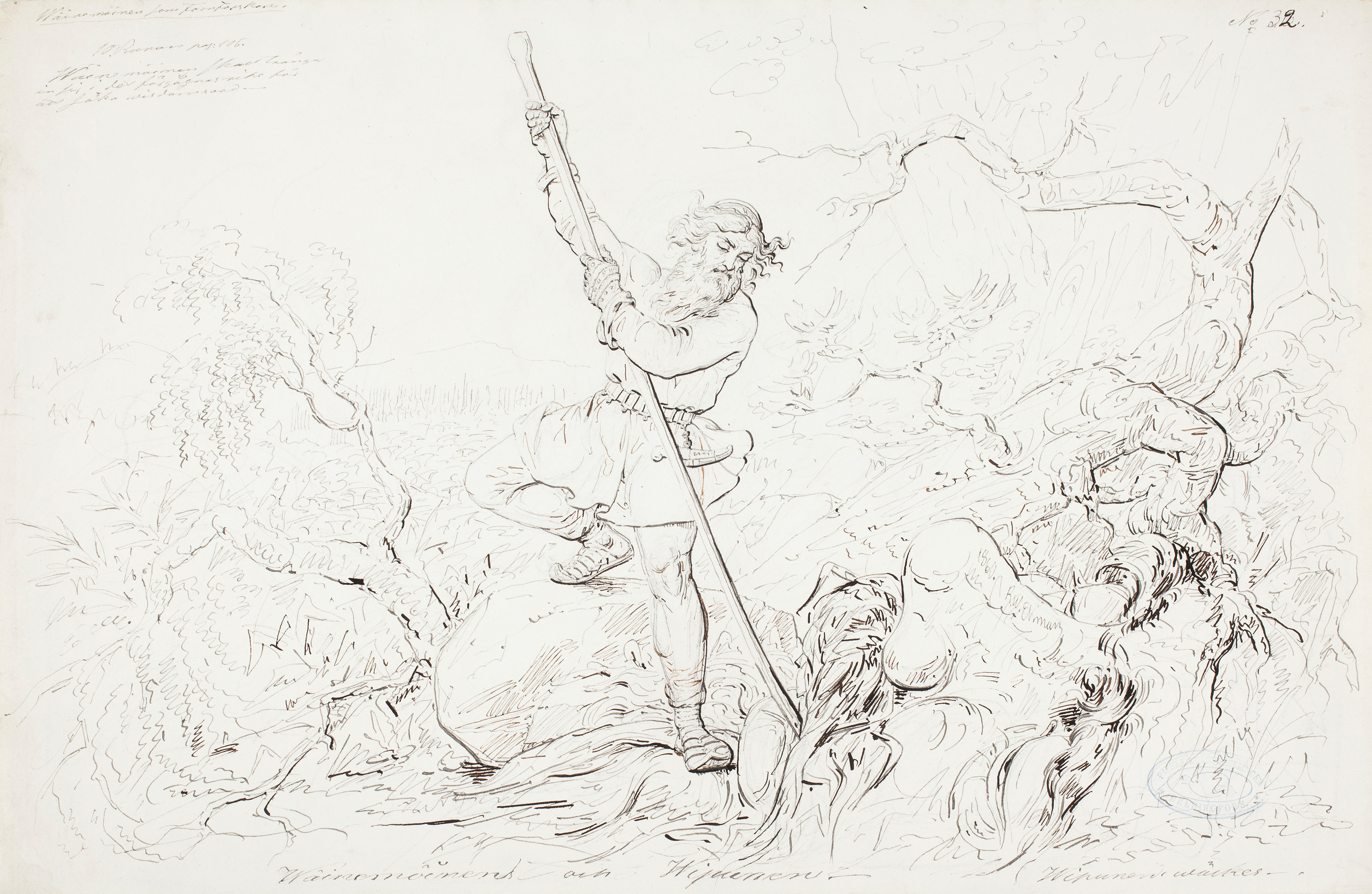
Väinämöinen wakes the giant Antero Vipunen by Robert Wilhelm Ekman (1860).

In the Kalevala, Väinämöinen has a spell with three words or luotes missing. In order to obtain them, he goes to wake up the sleeping Vipunen by pushing sharp stakes into his grave and through his mouth and stomach. Väinämöinen hits Vipunen in the stomach so hard that he gives up the luotes to get rid of the stomach ache.

== Other ==
In 1938, the Finnish composer Uuno Klami wrote the symphonic poem Vipusessa käynti (In the Belly of Vipunen), for baritone, men's chorus, and orchestra. This piece, which musically depicts the Väinämöinen-Vipunen story described above, received its world premiere recording by the Finnish conductor Sakari Oramo and the Finnish Radio Symphony Orchestra on the Ondine label (ODE859-2, 1995); the vocalists are Petri Lindroos and the Polytech Choir.

Antero Vipunen also gave his name to a book edited by Yrjö Karilas, which contains various plays and games, and contains both general and specialised knowledge. (Antero Vipunen: arvoitusten ja ongelmien, leikkien ja pelien sekä eri harrastajien pikkujättiläinen WSOY, Porvoo 1950. The 1st edition).

== Other sources ==
- Kalevala, the national epic of Finnish people.
- , Antero Vipunen
- (Karilas bio)

== See also ==
- Kalevala
- Mimir
- Ymir
