= Luote =

A luote (plural luotteet) is a magical Finnish incantation in Kalevala meter. Luotes have possibly been needed only for the most powerful spells, in which case they have denoted especially holy words. Different incantations have been distinct luotes, which have been must a command of to be able to the incantation.

The Finnish noun luote seems to derive from the verb luottaa ('to trust'), implying that the words of the luote have been entrusted or given up only from a seer to a close relative or student, or from the dead or a spirit to a seer. (Another Finnish word from the same root is luovuttaa, meaning 'to give up'.)

Finnish mythology includes stories in which a missing luote has to be fetched from sources such as Tuonela, Louhi or the buried giant Antero Vipunen.
