= List of minor Finnish deities =

List of minor deities in Finnish mythology, either mentioned by Mikael Agricola in his preamble to the Finnish translation of the Book of Psalms in 1551, or addressed in Finnic incantations and other runic songs collected in Suomen kansan vanhat runot.

In Modern Finnish, deity-like figures in Finnish mythology are often described with two words: jumala and haltija. Risto Pulkkinen described a jumala as a being who rules over a wider concept, such as water, while a haltija is more localized, ruling over a specific body of water. According to him, there is only a small number of beings in Finnish paganism which could be called jumala, but a wide variety of haltija beings.

== Etelätär ==
Etelätär, Suetar or Suvetar (all lit. 'Lady South') is a luonnotar and, according to Christfried Ganander, sunny weather itself. She's on the move in the spring when it's raining and southern wind blows: this was ideal time to let cows to pasture, as she would protect the cattle in her embrace. During northern wind, evil things were on the move instead. In runic songs, she is asked to bring refreshing wind and healing rain, as well as look after cattle.

=== Epithets ===
Epithet	Epithet meaning	Regions
Etelätär, neito nuori Etelätär, neity nuori	'Etelätär, young maiden'	Kainuu, Ostrobothnia, South Savo
Etelätär, ilman impi	'Etelätär, air maiden'	North Karelia
Etelätär, luonnon eukko	'Etelätär, old woman of nature'	Kainuu, White Karelia
Suetar, hyvä emäntä Suvetar, hyvä emäntä	'Suetar, good mistress'	Kainuu, North Ostrobothnia, White Karelia
Suetar, valivo vaimo Suvetar, valio vaimo	'Suetar, outstanding woman/wife'	Kainuu, White Karelia

== Hillervo and Juoletar ==
Hillervo and Juoletar are a pair of water related haltijas known from one runic song collected by Christfried Ganander. He identified Hillervo as the Mother of Otters and Juoletar as her husband, a beautiful man and Finnish Neptune. This has awoken a lot of questions among researchers, as they don't appear in other runic songs, and Juoletar is an explicitly feminine name with the final suffix -tar. According to Martti Haavio's theory, Hillervo was originally the Mother of Polecats, but as polecats only lived in Finland between the 13th and 17th centuries (before returning in the 20th century), Hillervo of polecat hunting spells was reutilized in otter hunting spells. Haavio connected the name Juoletar to the name Kuolari mentioned in a Ladoga Karelian, Karelian language otter-hunting song, believing it to have originally been *Juolari. Therefore, Juoletar would be the original Mother of Otters, or the Elder of Otters (whether the rune singer referred to Juoletar as a mistress or a king).

Some researchers, such as Haavio and Matthias Castrén, have supported the theory that Hillervo would be the same goddess as Tellervo. Haavio suggested her name could come from either the word killeri 'trap' or hilleri 'polecat', finding the latter theory more likely. Kaarle Krohn suggested origins in hilla 'cloudberry' and hilleri as well. Krohn also suggested a connection to Hilasatar, maiden of Hiisi, mentioned in a Kainuu runic song describing the origin of copper (sharing similarities with the runic songs describing the origin of the common lizard). In Krohn's opinion, these names could be connected to Saint Hilarius.

The name Juoletar has been theorized to come from either juolukka 'bog bilberry', known in Swedish as utterbär 'otter berry', or the word juolua 'oxbow lake'. Haavio thought these two words could be connected to each other, further connecting to an older name of the otter or a description of an otter's place of living (calling juolua 'river fork which periodically dries up').

=== Epithets ===
Epithet	Epithet meaning	Regions
Hillervo, oma emuu	'Hillervo, mother of one's own'	Ostrobothnia, unknown
Hillervo, hyvä emäntä	'Hillervo, good mistress'	Ostrobothnia, unknown
(About Hillervo:) Vejen ehtosa emäntä	'Generous mistress of water'	Ostrobothnia, unknown
Juoletar ukko kaunis	'Juoletar, beautiful old man'	Ostrobothnia, unknown
(About Juoletar:) Vejin kultanen kuningas	'Golden king of water'	Ostrobothnia, unknown
Kuolari, kultani emäntä	'Kuolari, golden mistress'	Ladoga Karelia

== Juonetar ==
Juonetar, Juonitar or Uramatar is a haltija or goddess who only appears in two written down runic songs, one being from Kainuu and the other from Ladoga Karelia. Both songs are spells or prayers for hunting forest reindeer. For this reason, Martti Haavio identified Juonetar as the Mother of Reindeer. The songs ask Juonetar to make her "lines" run through the bluish forests and for Uramatar not to cover up animal tracks.

Kaarle Krohn initially thought Juonetar was but a corruption of Johannes (John the Baptist). Later, he also suggested Juonetar could be the personification of juoni or ura 'track'. Haavio connected the word to Karelian juoni 'line of reindeer; reindeer tracks in snow' and Sámi juone 'reindeer path; path of reindeer tracks in snow'. Similarly, the Finnish word ura means a 'narrow path; path of sheep' as well as a path made by cows. With this connection, Uramatar would be synonymous with Juonetar in meaning.

=== Epithets ===
Epithet	Epithet meaning	Regions
Juonetar, metän jumala	'Juonetar, god of the forest'	Kainuu
Juonitar, metsän emäntä	'Juonitar, mistress of the forest'	Ladoga Karelia
Uramatar, uusi piika	'Uramatar, new maid'	Kainuu

== Kasaritar ==
The common lizard was thought to be born from copper, so its mother in runic songs was called Kasaritar, Kasarikki, Kasarikko or Vasketar (kasari 'saucepan', vaski 'copper'). One North Ostrobothnian song also mentions the common lizard's father, Uparo (likely from kupari 'copper'), along with Kasaritar.

Descriptions of how the common lizard was born vary. First to write of it was Christfried Ganander in 1789, stating that a satyr named Vingas lied with Vangas, and their son was Vangamoinen, the lord of snakes and lizards. It's been theorized that names such as Vankamoinen originate from the name Väinämöinen. Another song written down by Ganander stated that "Vingas lied with Vangas, / with his own mother's child". A Kainuu song states that a man named "Vingas Vankamoinen" lied with Vangas and wind impregnated someone, and labour is attempted unsuccessfully in water and in hays, until finally, giving birth to the common lizard was successful in a rotten tree stump. Another Kainuu song gives this scenario a prelude, in which Kasaritar fell down from a tree branch and the berries and twigs on the ground break her stomach; then Vingas lied with Vangas, and the common lizard was born. The common lizard is said to have been made by Kasaritar, its head cast from copper. If the common lizard has done something bad (viha 'poison'), Kasaritar is asked to "drink the poison as brännvin" into her "golden dome, coppery stomach".

Another Kainuu song described Vangas swallowing a bubble on the sea, the bubble burning her throat, and the common lizard being born. In his book Magic Songs of the Finns, Elias Lönnrot combined the above-mentioned elements, creating a lizard origin song where Syöjätär spits a bubble on the sea, and Kasaritar swallows it and then becomes pregnant with the common lizard.

=== Epithets ===
Epithet	Epithet meaning	Regions
Kasaritar, kaunis neito	'Kasaritar, beautiful maiden'	Kainuu, North Karelia, Olonets Karelia, White Karelia
Kasarikki, nuori neiti	'Kasarikki, young lady'	Kainuu
Vasketar, valio vaimo	'Vasketar, outstanding woman/wife'	Olonets Karelia

== Köndös ==
Köndös is a deity mentioned by Mikael Agricola in 1551 as the creator swiddens and fields. E.N. Setälä connected the name to Mari language kinda 'grain, bread'. He also wondered if it was related to the Finnish word köynnös 'vine'. In the 1930s, Uno Harva connected him to the Eastern Finnish folklore figure Köntys 'clumsy person', who created swiddens by cutting down trees, being very strong but also clumsy. R.E. Nirvi wrote that "creating swiddens and fields" should be understood as sowing swiddens and fields. This is why Harva later connected Köndös to Sampsa Pellervoinen instead. Martti Haavio thought Köndös was actually Saint Urban of Langres, the patron of vineyards.

== Osmotar ==
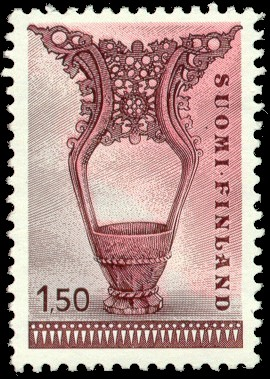
Traditional Finnish beer drinking vessel depicted in a stamp from 1976.

Osmotar is a kave brewing the first beer in the runic songs describing the origin of beer. Despite her best attempts, she can't get the drink to ferment so she summons animals to help her. She does the summoning by rubbing her hands together, which is a shamanistic method. The beer brewing happens in the center of the world. A marten brings her the drool of fighting animals which finally works. Yeast was not available to Finns in the past, so the drool of a boar was one of the alternatives used in beer making.

The word osmo means a wolverine or a bear, depending on the dialect. It is also used as a synonym for Kaleva, as well as a synonym for 'bridegroom'. Haavio believed the name Osmotar was not a feminine derivate of the word Osmo at all, but a compound word of os-motar, 'plant juice lees' or in other words, 'yeast'. He also believed the word "kapo" in her epithet doesn't mean a kave, but kabu (Russian for 'small bread'). Anna-Leena Siikala thought Haavio was mistaken in this view, as Osmotar's names also appear in other contexts outside of beer brewing.

In Karelia, she has also been called Saarivo.

=== Epithets ===
Epithet	Epithet meaning	Regions
Osmotar oluen seppä Kosmotar oluen seppä	'Osmotar, smith of ale'	Kainuu, North Savo, Olonets Karelia, White Karelia
Kapo kaljojen tekijä Kapo kahjahin panija	'Kave who makes beers' 'Kave who brews beers'	Kainuu, North Savo, White Karelia
Osmotar oiva vaimo	'Osmotar splendid wife/woman'	Kainuu
Kalevatar kelpo emäntä	'Kalevatar fine mistress'	Kainuu
Kalevatar kaljavaimo Kalevatar kaljaseppä	'Kalevatar beer wife/woman' Kalevatar beer smith	Olonets Karelia, White Karelia

== Otavatar ==
Otavatar (lit. 'Lady Big Dipper') is a luonnotar or goddess asked to light up the night sky in order to make it easier to find a lost object in the night, or find the thief of a lost object. According to Christfried Ganander, she is a goddess from the Big Dipper and, according to Carl Axel Gottlund, although it is a part of the Ursa Major constellation, it is personified as a girl with the feminine name Otavatar. Along with her appears Kipinätär (lit. 'Lady Spark'), who is called Hiisi's cat, and who protects items and scares away thieves. A runic song from the Karelian Isthmus says a cloth weaved by a girl is so fine, it's as if it was made by Kuutar, Otavatar, and/or Tähetär (lit. 'Lady Star').

Otavatar's sole epithet is Otavatar, päivän tyttö 'Otavatar, girl of the sun'.

== Panu ==
Panu in runic songs means fire, flame or personified fire haltija. Panu is called a sunny son, created by sun goddess Auringotar. Kainuu runic singers considered Panu a very powerful word for fire: mentioning it in spells was essential. However, when asked what kind of deity Panu was, answers varied from fire's protector to birther to mother, etc. In Kainuu and Rear Bothnian songs, Panu also has the epithet Panu parka, Tuonen poika 'Poor Panu, son of Tuoni'. In Central Finland, this appears as Panun parka, Tuonen poika 'Poor one of fire, son of Tuoni', and in South Savo and Ostrobothnia as Punaparta, Tuonen poika 'Red beard, son of Tuoni'. Ganander called Punaparta one of Tuoni's sons and the guardian spirit of fire. According to these songs, he "churned a fiery churn" in clean white clothes. According to Anna-Leena Siikala, the word panu is of Baltic origin.

The feminine form Panutar (or Pannatar) also exists in runic songs: Christfried Ganander called her the serpent's milkmaid who caused burning and pain. Runic songs from Kainuu, Rear Bothnia, North Savo, Olonets Karelia and Ostrobothnia also describe that a spark of fire has feathers of panuttaret (feminine Panutar in plural). An Olonets Karelian song also calls humans of panuttaret, and a great creation of Panutar.

=== Epithets ===
Epithet	Epithet meaning	Regions
Panu poika Aurinkoinen	'Panu Sunny son'	Kainuu, North Karelia
Panu poika auringoisen	'Panu, son of little Sun'	Kainuu
Panu parka, Tuonen poika	'Poor Panu, son of Tuoni'	Kainuu, Rear Bothnia

== Rongoteus ==
Rongoteus is a haltija or god of rye first mentioned by Mikael Agricola in 1551. In 1761, I.D. Alopaeus wrote Rongotäus was worshipped in North Savo in order to make rye grow. Runic songs feature the names in multiple forms, such as Runkoteivas, Runkateivas, Runkateira, Rukitohvana, Rukitehvana and Rukotivo. J.J. Mikkola thought the -teus and -teivas endings came from Proto-Germanic *tīwaz 'god', like the Old Icelandic word tivar'. Kaarle Krohn supported this view. Because of the -tehvana and -tohvana endings, Martti Haavio thought it came from Saint Stephen, Theodorus and Theophanes. Anna-Leena Siikala thought Mikkola's explanation was more likely due to the long history of Finno-Ugric rye farming. The name Runkateivas was unknown to 19th century runic song collectors, as multiple misspelled the genetive of the name as "Runkat ej vaan" and "Runka tei vai". His sole epithet is rukiinen '(made) of rye': e.g. Rukkiinen Runkateira.

== Sanervatar ==
Sanervatar is a sauna haltija mentioned only in runic songs from Kainuu. When a sick person is being bathed, she is asked to bring heat and löyly into the sauna but keep them out of the wounds so they won't hurt the patient. A runic song from Ostrobothnia mentions a being named Auteretar in the same context of bathing the sick. She is called the creator of löyly. Her name is thought to come from the Finnish word auer 'sun haze'. A runic song from North Karelia further mentions Salvatar, who is asked to secretly arrive in the sauna to help a woman who is giving birth. Krohn connected Sanervatar and Salvatar, believing the original form of the name to have been Salevatar. According to Lönnrot, saleva means 'slender, dainty'.

=== Epithets ===
Epithet	Epithet meaning	Regions
Sanervatar, saunapiika	'Sanervatar, sauna maid'	Kainuu
Salvatar, saunavaimo	'Salvatar, sauna woman/wife'	North Karelia

== Suonetar ==
Suonetar (lit. 'Lady Vein' or lit. 'Lady Tendon'), Kalvotar (lit. 'Lady Membrane') and Lihatar (lit. 'Lady Flesh') are a trio of names which appear in incantations for healing a horse's sprained ankle. All names are given the same epithet: sorea neito 'graceful maiden'. Runic songs from Central Finland use all three names, while a runic song from North Karelia only uses the name Suonetar. Suonetar is asked to spin new tendons to replace the sprained ones.

Castrén presented Suonetar as the opposite of Kivutar, a healer. Kaarle Krohn thought Suonetar, Kalvotar and Lihatar are all just names for the Virgin Mary.

== Terhetär ==
Terhetär (Kainuu and White Karelia, lit. 'Lady Fog'), Terhotar (Kainuu) or Ututyttö (Ladoga Karelia, North Karelia, South Savo and White Karelia, lit. 'Mist girl') is a luonnotar who sieves mist. She is asked to sieve mist so animals don't notice an approaching hunter, or a demon can't see a person in order to shoot at them with a painful arrow. Alternatively, she is asked to detach her own sharp arrows from a person. One incantation from North Karelia also calls her a daughter of Tapio. Her epithet Terhen neiti 'Miss of thin fog' also once appears as an epithet for Kivutar.

Based on her, Lönnrot invented the names U'utar for Old Kalevala and Terhenetär for New Kalevala.

=== Epithets ===
Epithet	Epithet meaning	Regions
Terhetär, terävä neiti	'Terhetär, sharp miss'	Kainuu, White Karelia
Ututyttö, terhen neiti Ututyttö, neito terho	'Mist girl, maiden of thin fog'	Ladoga Karelia, North Karelia, White Karelia
Ututyttö, ilman neito	'Mist girl, maiden of air'	South Savo
Luonnotar, tytär Tapion	'Luonnotar, a daughter of Tapio'	North Karelia

== Tuometar ==
Tuometar (lit. 'Lady bird cherry') is often called a daughter of Tapio in runic songs. This epithet is also given to Tuulikki and Hongatar.

The name Tuometar appears in Kainuu, Rear Bothnia, Norrbotten, North Karelia, North Ostrobothnia, North Savo and White Karelia, mainly in bear-related songs. She is sometimes called a mother (or one of them) of the bear. She has been considered a tree haltija, protector of the bird cherry, while Martti Haavio believed Tuometar is actually the same goddess as Hongatar, along with Katajatar (lit. 'Lady juniper'), Petäjätär (lit. 'Lady pine'), Pihlajatar (lit. 'Lady rowan'), and more. The peijaiset bear worship ritual was also called Tuomettaren juomingit, Pihjalattaren pidot ('Drinking party of Tuometar, feast of Pihlajatar').

Another name for Tuometar has been Kataatar, after Saint Catherine. A South Ostrobothnian cattle song also asks Tuomen piika, metsän neitsyt ('Maid of the bird cherry, maiden of the forest') to look after cattle.

=== Epithets ===
Epithet	Epithet meaning	Regions
Tuometar, tytär Tapion	'Tuometar, daughter of Tapio'	North Karelia, White Karelia
Tuometar, Tapion neiti Tuonetar, Tapion neiti	'Tuometar, maiden of Tapio'	Kainuu, Rear Bothnia
Tuometar, Tapion tytti	'Tuometar, Tapio's girl'	White Karelia
Tuometar, tytär typerä	'Tuometar, foolish daughter'	White Karelia
Tuometar, hyvä emäntä	'Tuometar, good mistress'	North Savo
Tuometar, puhas emäntä	'Tuometar, pure mistress'	North Savo
Kataatar, kaunis vaimo	'Kataatar, beautiful woman/wife'	North Savo
Päivälän miniä Päivölän miniä	'Daughter-in-law of Päivölä'	Kainuu
Tuomen piika, mettän neittyt	'Maid of the bird cherry, maiden of the forest'	South Ostrobothnia
