= Kuutar =

Goddess of the Moon in Finnish mythology

- Luonnotar of the Moon
- Other names: Ingria: Huutari, Kuutarmoi, Kuuttara, Kuuttari, Kuuttarma, Kuuttarmo, Tuuteri; Kainuu: Kater, Kuuto, Laatter; Karelia: Kuittari, Kulttar, Kunttari, Kuuntari, Kuutermanni, Kuutoma
- Animals: Wasps
- Color: Gold
- Gender: Female
- Ethnic group: Finns, Karelians

Kuutar (pronounced [ˈkuːtɑr]; lit. 'Lady Moon') is the goddess of the Moon in Finnish mythology.

According to Anna-Leena Siikala, Kuutar and Päivätär belong to a tradition that was influenced by Baltic mythology.

== In runic songs ==
She owns the gold of the Moon, spins golden yarns, and weaves clothes out of them.

In runic songs, she appears alongside Päivätär in incantations asking her to tell her children, wasps, not to sting. In runic songs from Kainuu, her name varies from Kuuto and Kater to Laatter, losing the original kuu 'moon' meaning in favour of poetic alliteration (e.g. Laatter lapsijasi). Kuutar does not typically appear independently of Päivätär in runic songs, while Päivätär does appear independently of Kuutar. As multiple goddesses were mixed with the Virgin Mary due to Christianization, Päivätär and Kuutar also appear in some instances as synonyms for one being similar to Mary.

Ingrian runic songs mention Kuuttaren kuja 'Kuutar's alley' or Kuuttaren mäki 'Kuutar's hill' where Kuuttaren tytär 'Kuutar's daughter' is weaving. There is a theme in runic songs where someone cries, and a tree is born from the tears. One rare runic song from Ilomantsi puts it so Päivätär and Kuutar cry, and the Great Oak grows from their tears. In Finnish Karelian runic songs, Kuutar and Päivätär are asked to weave golden and silver clothes for protection. In a Ladoga Karelian song, Mielikki under the name Kuitar is asked to bake a fatty and nectariferous cake. In another song, this was misinterpreted as Kuutar baking, and Päivätär is then added to accompany her.

A runic song from Ilomantsi sets "Kuutar" as a sort of synonym for Loviatar or Syöjätär, or refers to her genitalia as Kuuttaren kupu 'Kuutar's dome', while another one from Kainuu puts the name Kuutar along with Kärehetär in a bear hunting incantation.

== Moon worship among Finns ==
New moon was especially lucky and healthy time and the best time to propose, for instance. The new moon was greeted while holding bread or money, and good health was asked from it. The lunar cycle was caused by Rahko painting the moon in tar, or kapeet eating the moon (kapeet refer to nature goddesses in some contexts, but could also mean wild animals). These eaters could be understood in various ways, such as canines or snakes, even witches. Forest Finns said that kapeet ate the Moon and Rahko (someone who had committed suicide) forged a new Moon out of cow hooves and fat, eventually becoming a kave when a new Rahko took their place. In a belief local to Laitila, it is said that the moon goes dark when the son of Kaleva puts his hand in front of it. The ring around the moon was seen as a sign of coming sunshine in Finland, opposite to Germany and Sweden where it was seen as a sign of rain and bad weather. Christfried Ganander wrote in 1789 that it was the demon Kuumet (possibly from kummitus 'ghost') who imprisoned the Moon in a ring, and the goddess Kavet freed the Moon.

Kaarle Krohn believed Kavet meant Virgin Mary. The Forest Finn Kaisa Vilhunen said it was the spinning girl Hepleija who covered the Moon with her hair to make it dark, and she could do the same to the Sun. Around Europe, it has been common to see Mary as a spinner, her threads hanging down from the Moon. However, she was likely not the original spinner of these tales but came to replace the original spinner due to Christianization of Europe. People saw an image of a spinning woman on the surface of the Moon, resulting in the story common in Europe where a spinning girl had been taken up to the Moon.

Kuutar and Päivätär are also known as spinners and weavers. Krohn thought them to be references to Mary, while Väinö Salminen connected this to a nature myth: the poet saw golden, silver and yellow threads trickling down from the Moon towards ground, seeing dew forming on leaves and grass like glittering teardrops. From this came the poem where Kuutar's daughter is weaving with golden thread spun by Päivätär, but the thread is cut when a cloud gets in the way. Still, more dew appears, showing how she began to cry over the broken thread.

As stated, Forest Finn Kaisa Vilhunen, who knew of tradition of the Forest Finns and Rautalampi, called the Moon's spinning girl Hepleija Jenuveeva (Genevieve). Her home was in the Polaris (at the top of the world pillar Sammas) but once, Luukka had attempted to catch her so she couldn't return home. With the help of Väinämöinen, she was able to escape to the Milky Way and became the protector of the Sun and the Moon. The lunar eclipse was her sauna bath day when she covered the Moon with her hair while brushing it. It was Väinämöinen who gave signs in the stars indicating when it was a good time to cause a lunar or solar eclipse. A connection between the Moon and a long-haired maiden is further made in a Forest Finnish runic song which states that Kapo (Kavet) "released the Moon from a ring, the long-haired one from trouble". Kavet also appears as a helper in childbirth in some runic songs: a child's birth and the Moon's release from a ring have a magical connection.

== Epithets ==
Epithet	Epithet meaning	Regions
Kuutar, korea vaimo	'Kuutar, beautiful woman/wife'	Kainuu
Kuutar, koria impi	'Kuutar, beautiful maiden'	Ladoga Karelia

== In the Kalevala ==
According to the Kalevala, the daughter of the air Ilmatar allowed a teal to lay its egg on her knee as she floated in the abyss. The egg fell and its parts formed the universe: the white of the egg became the Moon, and the yolk the Sun. In Kalevala, young maidens ask Kuutar to give them some of her golden jewelry and clothes. She is described as a great beauty.

== See also ==
- List of lunar deities
