= Päivätär =

Finnish Goddess of the Sun

- Luonnotar of the Sun
- Other names: Ingria: Päivytär, Päivätaari, Päivätoori, Päivötär; Kainuu: Auringotar, Päivytär; Karelia: Auringotar, Päivitär, Päivytär, Päivänluomi, Päivötär; Ostrobothnia: Auringotar, Aurinnatar; Savo: Pääjätär
- Animals: Wasps
- Color: Silver
- Gender: Female
- Ethnic group: Finns, Karelians
- Offspring: Panu (fire)

Equivalents
- Baltic: Saulė

Päivätär (pronounced [ˈpæi̯ʋætær]; lit. 'Lady Sun') is the goddess of the Sun in Finnish mythology.

Professor Anna-Leena Siikala finds it possible that Päivätär was a goddess who ruled over life and light. During Christian period, she was replaced by Virgin Mary. According to her, Kuutar and Päivätär belong to a tradition that was influenced by Baltic mythology.

== In runic songs ==
Päivätär owns the silver of the Sun, spins silver yarns, and weaves clothes out of them. In runic songs, Päivätär is known as the mother of wasps, incantations asking her to command her children not to sting. Another name which appears in runic songs is Auringotar, which has the same meaning as Päivätär. Auringotar is mentioned as the creator of fire. Incantations from Central Finland and South Ostrobothnia refer to the wasp as a spark of fire.

Pätösen poika 'Son of the Sun' is an epithet which appears often in runic songs, most of the time in reference to Väinämöinen. Because runic songs from Kainuu and North Ostrobothnia call Päivätär the creator of fire, and Kainuu runic songs call fire the son of Vipunen, Siikala drew a connection between the Sun and Vipunen's son, Lemminkäinen. Lemminkäinen's name is often thought to be connected to fire, the Sun, and fertility. Vipunen, in this context, she thought was actually the fertility god Virankannos.

A runic song collected by Christfried Ganander in the 1700s mentions Kavet as the one who allowed the Sun and the Moon to shine, and Päivätär as the one who "freed the Son of the Sun". Päivätär is, like many other goddesses, mixed with Virgin Mary in Christianized runic songs. In the above cases, the Sun or Son of the Sun which were freed by Kave or Päivätär also got mixed with Christian imagery: the Virgin Mary freed and saved Jesus, or it was even Jesus who freed the Sun and the Moon. Similarly, Finnish Karelian songs describe that birchbark came from either Virgin Mary or Päivätär's scarf. As multiple goddesses were mixed with Mary, Päivätär appears as synonymous with Kivutar and Kuutar in some instances when the names seem to refer to one being just like Mary.

Some researchers, such as Julius Krohn, have interpreted the Sampo which was stolen from a rocky hill in Pohjola to mean the Sun, though not every researcher agrees. Matti Kuusi described the purpose of the Sampo myth as a ritual song of the birth of agriculture. In Kainuu runic songs, Väinämöinen frees the Sun from a rock by forging.

White Karelian runic songs give Päivätär additional roles by connecting the myths of Lemminkäinen and the origin of beer. Runic singers had disagreements if a divine banquet was held in Pohjola or Päivölä; if latter, Päivätär was sometimes presented as the mistress of this land. She warned everyone not to invite Lemminkäinen (or Kaukomieli) to the banquet, and when Osmotar is brewing beer for this occasion, she is called "Päivätär's girl". Alternatively, it is the sons of Päivätär that are heading for a banquet, and she warns her sons of the dangers on the way.

One rare runic song from Ilomantsi puts it so Päivätär and Kuutar cry, and the Great Oak grows from their tears. In a Ladoga Karelian song, Mielikki under the name Kuitar is asked to bake a fatty and nectariferous cake. In another song, this was misinterpreted as Kuutar baking, and Päivätär is then added to accompany her. In Savo, her name has morphed into Pääjätär in an incantation driving out pains to Kivutar's mitten and below "Pääjätär's" head (Finnish: pää 'head').

Ingrian runic songs mention a location called Kuuttaren kuja, Päivättären tanhua 'Kuutar's alley, Päivätär's (stock)yard', where Kuutar's daughter is weaving, sometimes accompanied with "Sun's girl" (Päivän tyttö).

== Sun worship among Finns ==
The sun cross symbol.

Matthias Castrén thought Finns had, once upon a time, worshipped the Sun in its visible, material form. However, there is very little information of Finnish Sun worship. People in Finland, as well as Estonia, did draw sun crosses next to doors and windows, and on other objects in order to drive away evil spirits, especially around the winter solstice. According to Jean Baptiste Holzmayer, these were images of the Sun, at least in Estonia. It is not certain to which degree these symbols were influenced by old sun worship, and to which degree they have come from Christian cultural influence and cross imagery. When the Dutch Andries van Wouw had to travel across Finland in 1616, he wrote about long poles with an encircled cross at the top and a wide altar-like podium at the bottom. These, called ristinkanta, were considered sacred, and people sacrificed goats, calves and sheep, mixed their blood and spread it on the ristinkanta. Regardless of the sun cross symbol, these were not for Sun worship.

== Epithets ==
| Epithet | Epithet meaning | Regions |
|---|---|---|
| Päivätär, pätöä neito | 'Päivätär, adept maiden' | North Karelia |
| Neiti Päivitär, pätevä | 'Miss Päivitär, adept' | Ladoga Karelia |

== In the Kalevala ==
According to the Kalevala, the daughter of the air Ilmatar allowed a teal to lay its egg on her knee as she floated in the abyss. The egg fell and its parts formed the universe: the white of the egg became the Moon, and the yolk the Sun.

In Kalevala, young maidens ask Päivätär to give them some of her silver jewellery and clothes. She is described as a great beauty.

== See also ==
- List of solar deities
- Beaivi (Sáami sun deity)
