= Hiis (sacred site) =

Estonian term for a sacred natural site

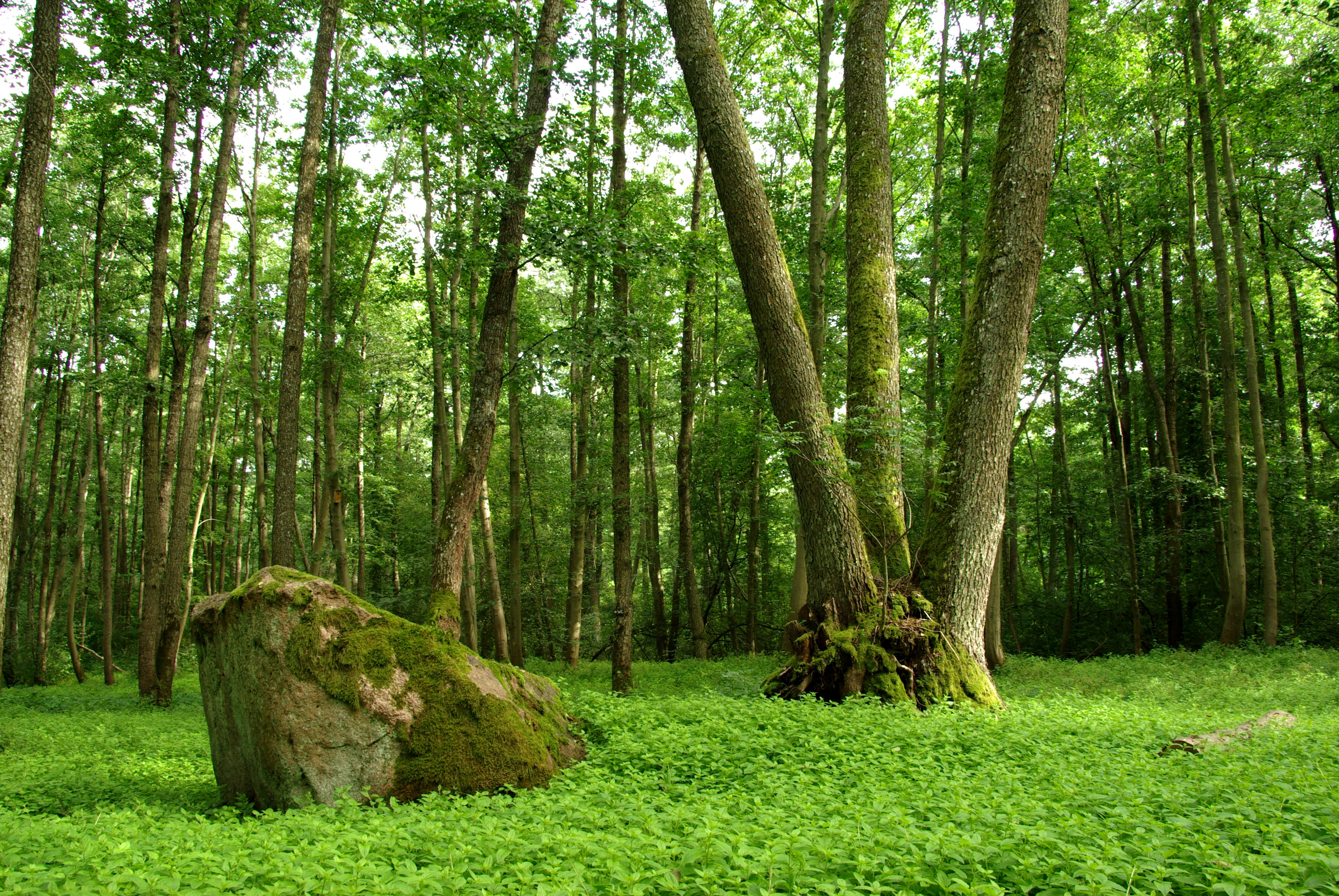
Maardu hiis (2009). Monument 17697 in the Estonian Kultuurimälestiste riiklik register

A hiis is a term in Estonian used to denote a sacred natural site, often a tree covered hilltop.

== History of hiis scholarship ==
The written use of the term hiis is first recorded in 1694 in a Christian catechism against the breaking of the First Commandment. In 18th century Christian writings the term was used generally to refer to pagan cult buildings, as well as any supposed creatures inhabiting such a place.

The term hiis regained importance during the emergence of Estonian identity and nationalism during the late 18th and 19th C. (see also Estonian nationalism). Estonian language scholars began to take an interest in their own culture—early etymological attributions of the word included a connection to the Egyptian Isis (Christfried Ganander, 1789), or to the Estonian Hiid [giant] (Kristjan Jaak Peterson, 1822)—both used the term to refer to a creature or deity, not a place. The term was also used as a prefix to refer to supernatural creatures.

In the early 20th century the term began to be used for places, such as groves, thought to be the sites of pagan worship—these descriptions of hiis sites could be colorful and idealised, heavily influenced by Estonian nation-identity building. This reintroduction caused a self-reinforcing stereotype to develop in the body of the Estonian people.

More serious attempts at scientific study of hiis sites began in the late 19th century and continued in the 20th century. Jaan Jung claimed, on the basis of his collection of folklore, that hiis were hilltop sacrificial sites, which drew people from distance for the rituals done there. Jung also collected data on pre-historic sites in Estonia he identified as hiis. In the early 20th C. a hiis was taken by scholars to be a forested hilltop site generally, but could also refer to bogs, or even flat ground.

Towards the mid 20th century, researchers such as Oskar Loorits, began to view hiis sites as having some connection to the dead, supported by parallels in Uralic folklore. This view matched a pattern in other contemporary scholarship that placed importance on death or cults of the dead as being of great importance in development of religious activities. However poor datability of folklore stories led to all such sites being lumped under "pre-historic religion" with not further insights.

In the second half of the 20th C. the primary method of research was linguistic analysis and etymology—though the word hiis is not known to have any parallel in other terms relating to trees, the usage has been analysed to refer to forests, thickets, single notable tree, or supernatural creatures. Linguistic connections to the Sami terms sii'da or siei'de [sanctuary or altar] were explored but could not be supported; connection to the Germanic hiiði or hiiÞi ['side' or 'part', can also mean 'nest'] were also considered.

Excavative archaeology of hiis sites has been done. Generally the sites show no evidence of habitation, with finds being generally rare also.

(Jonuks 2011) notes three types of sites attributed to be hiis:

1. Hills, typically prominent or anomalous, often the sites include stone graves—he considers such sites may have been common during the late Bronze and early Iron Age.
2. Plain sites, lacking any distinguishing feature—associated with nearby (<2 km) settlements, and lacking any connection to dates before the late Iron Age.
3. "Hidden sites"—places in isolated locations such as bogs—in (limited) references in Estonian folklore journeys to such places were connected with personal journeys focused on healing (pilgrimage).

Jonuks considers that the hilltop sites were abandoned as religious practices changed.

== Relationship with Christian church ==
Some Christian churches in Estonia are suspected to have been built on formerly sacred sites—this includes two churches on Saaremaa Island (Valjala Church and Pöide Church). The subject is (as of 2011) poorly researched; however churches established in the 13th C. are known to be built in association with cemeteries that date to pre-historic period (late Iron Age).

== See also ==
- Estonian neopaganism, recreated hiis sites from the 1930s onwards
- Hiisi, Finnish term with similar and other meanings
- Himorogi

== Citations and references ==
=== Cited sources ===
- Jonuks, Tonno (2009), "Hiis sites in the research history of Estonian sacred places" (PDF), Folklore, 42: 23–44, doi:10.7592/FEJF2009.42.jonuks
- Jonuks, Tonno (2011), "Hiis-sites in Northern Estonia: Distinctive Hills and Plain Fields" (PDF), Archaeologia Baltica, 15, doi:10.15181/ab.v15i1.19
