= Kalevi (mythology) =

Heroic figure in Estonian, Finnish and Karelian mythology

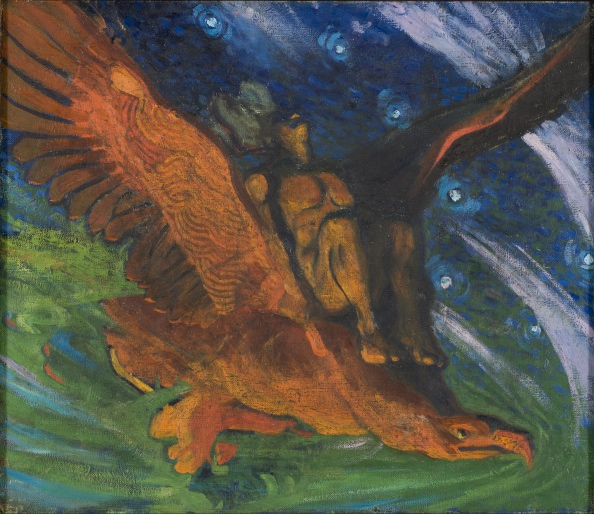
Kalev riding an eagle, Oskar Kallis (1917).

Kaleva (also known as Kalevi or Kalev) and his sons are important heroic figures in Estonian, Finnish and Karelian mythology. They are typically described as giants who lived in an area before the arrival of humans, but they also appear as mythic heroes in runic songs.

In the Finnish epic the Kalevala, Kaleva is an ancient Finnish ruler. In the Estonian writer Friedrich Reinhold Kreutzwald's epic poem Kalevipoeg, King Kalev was the father of King Kalevipoeg and the husband of Linda.

== Name ==
Multiple theories exist of the origin of the name Kaleva. The first such theory was made by Elias Lönnrot, who derived the name from the Russian word golová ('chief', 'head'). The name is too old to have been borrowed from Russian, however, and derivation from Proto-Slavic or Proto-Balto-Slavic forms is not possible for phonological reasons. Another suggested but phologically impossible origin is in the Old Norse name Kylfingjar. Paul Ariste proposed that the Estonian noun kalev derived from kale ('hard', 'severe'; cognates with Finnish kalea 'cool', 'hard', 'slippery'), which Ants Järv favoured. August Ahlqvist and Eemil Nestor Setälä thought the name had a Baltic origin, such as in the Lithuanian word kálvis 'smith', which was favoured by Aimo Turunen and not dismissed by Järv either. According to Mikko Heikkilä, the problems of this theory arise when noting that kaleva does not hold the primary meaning of 'smith', and Proto-Baltic *kalvis would've likely been loaned as **kalve, **kalvis or **kalviš into (Proto-)Finnish.

In 1918, T. I. Itkonen connected Kaleva to the Northern Sámi word gállagas-dolla 'phosphorescence of the sea' and the Lule Sámi word kāllaka jussa 'suddenly descending thick fog over a lake', literally 'old man's fart'. Uno Harva and Yrjö Toivonen developed the theory further by deriving the Finnic and Sámi words from a common proto-form, *kaleɣa. According to Heikkilä, the Proto-Sámi *kǡllǡs 'old honoured man' is a loan from Proto-Scandinavian *karlaz '(old) man' and cannot therefore be traced back to a Finno-Sámic proto-language. Heikkilä himself proposed a theory that Kaleva was initially loaned from Proto-Germanic and Proto-Scandinavian *χlewaz or phonologically reconstructed as *χᵃlewaz, which would be the older form of Hlér. Hlér or Ægir is the name of a giant and the personification of the sea in Norse mythology. A step-by-step development then would have been Proto-Scandinavian *χᵃléwaz ('sea', 'sea-god giant') → Late Proto-Finnic *Kalevas ('mythical giant') → Finnish Kaleva(s). Heikkilä further proposed that Kalanti, which was the name of the westernmost parts of Southwestern Finland in a map from 1347, would originally have been *Kalenδek in Late Proto-Finnic and would have its origins in the name Kaleva.

=== Osmo ===
The name Osmo appears in Finnish, Karelian, Ingrian and Estonian runic songs as a synonym for Kaleva. The feminine form Osmotar or Kalevatar appears as the kave brewing the first beer, but this could be a later variation: In Ingria, the brewer is "Kalervo's curly-haired son" and in East Karelia, the masculine Osmonen or Osmori. Osmo also appears as a synonym for the word Jumala. A West Ingrian song also uses the word Osmero as someone one could buy alcohol from, who Kaarle Krohn explained means a German noble living in Estonia. The name Osmo is also connected to casting iron. In Estonian, osmus or osman means 'cast iron', similar to the Old Norse word for cast iron, ásmundr. Ásmundr is also the name of a king in the Poetic Edda. According to Krohn, due to poetic alliteration, the initial has transformed into i-sound in a mention of North Savonian Ismo ilman tyttäriä 'Ismo of air daughters' and Kainuu Ismärätär, Tuonen tyttö 'Ismärätär, Girl of Tuoni'. In Ingria, variations like Ismero or Ismaro have come to refer to Ilmarinen instead.

== History ==
In Old Russian chronicles and bylinas from 1223 CE onwards, Tallinn is referred to as Kolyvan, which has been theorized to come from *Kalevan(linna) 'Kaleva's burg'. It also proves the original form of the name includes the final letter a. An even earlier mention of the name could be in Tabula Rogeriana by the Arab geographer Muhammad Al-Idrisi, which mentions a small fortress town named qlwry being situated in ˊslˊndh (Estonia). The first three letters, qlw, match the name Kaleva.

The first clear written references to a being named Kaleva appear in a list of deities published by Mikael Agricola in 1551, who describes Caleuanpoiat 'Kaleva's sons' as giants, and in the Leyen Spiegel by Heinrich Stahl (1641), which mentions Kalliweh.

Some historians have suggested that an even older reference may exist in the Old English poem "Widsith", composed around the 7th century and transcribed in the late 10th century. The poem states that "Caesar ruled the Greeks and Cælic the Finns". Mikko Heikkilä has considered it phonologically unlikely that Cælic would derive from Kaleva, and has suggested that it may instead come from the Proto-Sami word *kǡllek, though writing that the possibility of Cælic being a phonological blend of Kaleva and *kǡllek should be left open.

Johan Cajanus wrote in a letter in 1674 that Kaleva was an ancient Finnish king and had 12 sons, including Väinämöinen, Ilmarinen and Hiisi. He had, with his sons, conquered the whole of Russia once upon a time. 18th-century Finnish folklore-collector Cristfried Ganander later wrote the same. He listed the following sons of Kaleva and their places of living: Hiisi (Paltamo), Soini (Liminka), Kihovauhkonen, Liekiöinen (Savonia), Väinämöinen (Southwestern Finland) and Ilmarinen (Tavastia). They used to live in the hometown of their father, Paltamo, before moving to various different places, including to Kemi. In south-western Finnish folklore, kalevanpoika 'son of Kaleva' is a common epithet of heroes.

The title of Estonia's national epic Kalevipoeg means 'Son of Kalev' and the title of the Finnish national epic the Kalevala means 'Land of Kaleva'. Some have suggested that Kalevala might be the Estonian mainland. Some have believed the name Kalevala to be Lönnrot's invention, but it does appear in a couple of runic songs as the name of a mansion. It is not, therefore, the name of a region but a house or a smaller area.

== Myths ==
In Estonian stories, sons of Kalev were originally considered royalty. The Estonian word kalev means a 'giant'. In Finnish stories, the sons of Kaleva are referred to as giants who built several castles and lived in various regions of Finland. In both cases, they are often blamed for oddities in nature, such as strangely large or weird stones. They lived in Finland before the arrival of humans but left when human settlements spread. Christfried Ganander also wrote of the daughters of Kaleva, who had massive strength and carried large boulders in their aprons. According to a story told by a woman named Caisa from Kemi in the 1700s, Kaleva's daughter had picked up a horse, a plougher and his plough and brought them to her mother, asking what this beetle was that she found digging into the ground. The mother told her to take it away, saying they had to escape away from this land, for the humans had arrived to live there.

In a runic song from Ostrobothnia, the birth of Väinämöinen's father is described. He is not called Kaleva but Kave ukko 'old man Kave' and is described as the 'ancient eternal giant' (ikäinen iku-turilas). Turilas is a Proto-Germanic loan word (*Þurisaz 'giant'). In the runic song, Kave ukko grew tired of being in the womb and released himself with just a lift of his finger. He was born in full warrior gear with a sword and a saddled horse. Lönnrot considered Kave ukko to be another name for Kaleva in his 1827 thesis De Väinämöine, priscorum fennorum numine. The words turilas/turisas/tursas have caused much debate among scholars. Mikael Agricola mentioned Turisas as a Tavastian war god in 1551. Runic songs also mention Meri-Tursas 'sea giant' who impregnates Louhi by waves when she is in water to escape the heat and then proceeds to give birth to the diseases of the world, as well as Tulinen Tursas 'fiery giant' from Pohjola who steals the hays luonnottaret reaped and burns them, resulting in the growth of the Great Oak which threatens to cover up the Sun and the Moon. There is no consensus if these giants are one and the same being, or if they are multiple different giants. According to Anna-Leena Siikala, it is likely that Turisas and Tursas were originally two different beings who got mixed with each other in runic songs. She drew a connection between Kaleva, Tursas, and the Norse giants such as Ymir. As Kaleva's influence extends to the stars on the sky, as well as lightning, Siikala saw Kaleva as a cosmic, primordial giant.

In an Ingrian runic song, Kalervikko or Kaleva ploughs the seas and forests with his nails and teeth. Only one tuft is left intact and on it is a stump and from the stump, two boys emerge. According to Matti Kuusi, this is a version of a common Asian myth of the origin of humans. Thus, Kaleva participates in events in the beginning of the world.

Runic songs of Kullervo, especially prominent in southern areas such as Estonia and Ingria, mention him as a son of Kaleva (such as East Estonian Kuller Kalevi poega). Sometimes, his father is called Kalervo, but this is a later variation which morphed from Kaleva. Ingrian and Karelian runic songs further tell of the fight between two families, the other being the family of Kaleva or Kalevainen, who ruin each other's fields and possibilities to survive. Kalevainen and his family were exterminated but an unborn child survives and continues the family feud, bakes a stone inside the bread of a mean mistress of a house, and ends up committing incest. In a different runic song from Ilomantsi, after killing Kaleva, the enemies try to kill his son by throwing him into a large bonfire. However, he had the ability to control fire. To avenge his family, he asks Ilmarinen to forge him a sword and goes to war. Other songs tell he was later defeated on the battlefield. Some runic songs also call Lemminkäinen Kaleva's son, but runic songs from Kainuu and the Karelian Isthmus call him a son of Antero Vipunen instead. In the Estonian runic song Suisa suud, an unnamed son of Kalev (called Kalevipoeg, Sulevipoeg and Sulevi-Kalevipoeg) appears as a violent harasser of women. He demands a kiss from a maiden in a forest but she stabs him with a knife hidden under her skirt. When she tells her parents that she had killed a man, the parents state it was an acceptable act to defend her honour and could be compensated with the price of a horse.

Other rare and unclear names for sons of Kaleva in runic songs include Kalappi, who helps Väinämöinen fish the fire fish, and Isterva, who sows lands. Though Ganander called Ilmarinen a son of Kaleva, this title is never given to him in runic songs. Ilmarinen and Väinämöinen, who appear as divine beings participating in the forming of the world, are much different from the young, powerful, vandalising and harassing sons of Kaleva characterized in Kullervo and Kalevipoeg. The place where Louhi baptises her son Rickets is called the 'well of a son of Kaleva' (Kalevanpojan kaivo). In an Olonets Karelian song, the well was dug up by a son of Kaleva during the family feud. Thus, the name Kaleva became something that was used to show a person or a place to be of mythic and magical nature.

In Ostrobothnia and Kainuu, the son of Kaleva who is a vandalising slave who orders bears and wolves to tear his mistress apart is Soini, but the protagonist is typically Kullervo in other regions. Soini and Hiisi were brothers and lived in Liminka, North Ostrobothnia and Paltamo, Kainuu respectively. They visited each other and burned swiddens together, being able to cut down more forest in a day than a group of ten men could.

== Derived ==
Finnish people called the star Sirius Kalevan tähti 'Kaleva's star'. Orion's Belt was called Kalevan miekka 'Kaleva's sword', and swirls in the Milky Way Kalevan porras 'Kaleva's step', or Kalevan kynnys 'Kaleva's threshold'. Kalevantuli 'Kaleva's fire' has the meaning of "silent lightning". Kalevankuusi 'Kaleva's spruce' means a sacred spruce and Kalevan puu 'Kaleva's tree' a sacred tree.

== Legacy ==
=== In paintings ===
Oskar Kallis, an Estonian painter from the 1900s, produced the Kalevipoeg series of paintings portraying the epic heroic figure Kaleva/Kalevi/Kalev. These paintings are viewable at Kumu art museum in Estonia.

=== In government ===
Toompea, a hill in the centre of Tallinn, was said to be the tumulus over his grave, erected by Linda in memory of him. It is now Estonia's centre of government.

=== In sports ===
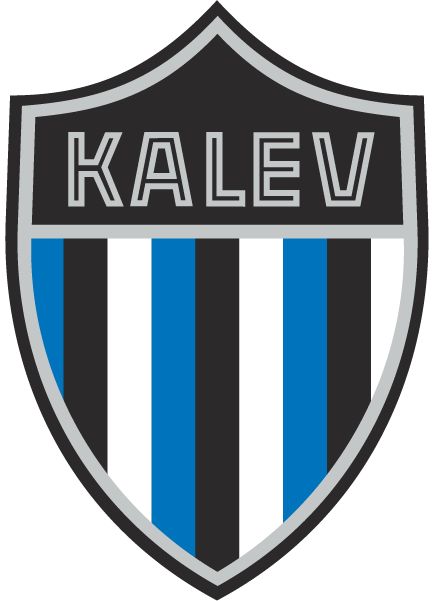

- KK Kalev, a basketball club from Estonia
- JK Tallinna Kalev, a football club from Estonia
- Kalevi Keskstaadion, a stadium in Estonia
- Kalev Sports Hall, an indoor sports hall in Estonia
- Kalevan Pallo, an ice hockey club from Finland
- Kalevan kisat, an annual sports event in Finland
- Kalevan Rasti, an orienteering club from Joensuu, Finland.

=== In toponymy ===
- Kalevala, Russia, a Karelian town of Uhtua
- In an old Russian chronicle the Estonian city of Tallinn was called Kolyvan (Estonianized: Kolõvan). It probably meant Kalev city.
- Kolyvan, a town in Siberia, Russia. Probably founded by ore prospectors from Olonets, Karelia, in the 18th century

== See also ==
- Kalevala
- Legends of Tallinn
- Väinämöinen
- Ilmarinen
- Joukahainen
- Lemminkäinen
- Louhi
- Hiisi
