= Kave (Finnish mythology) =

Spiritual entity in Finnish mythology

Kave, Kavet, Kaave, Kaveh or Luonnotar is a female spirit or goddess in Finnish mythology. She is called "the oldest of women" (vanhin vaimoloista). In one White Karelian poem, a similar figure is called Ilmatar (lit. 'Lady Air'), likely influencing Elias Lönnrot to create the Kalevala character Ilmatar.

Kave (pl. kapeet) is also a common noun used to refer to female nature spirits or goddesses in general. The same goes for luonnotar (pl. luonnottaret).

== In runic songs ==
In 1551, Mikael Agricola mentioned plural kapeet as those who "ate the moon" from pre-Christian Tavastians.

The oldest written mentions of singular Kave are from the 18th century, written down by Christfrid Ganander from Ostrobothnia. In these, Kavet is said to have freed the sun and the moon so they can shine. He specified that Agricola got it wrong: Kave helped to save the moon from Kuumet instead of eating the moon. He also wrote that Kaveh, Kavoh or Kavet is sometimes seen as a strong, benevolent spirit who was asked to help against illnesses. Ganander calls Kuumet or Kuumeh a demon who covered the moon. The same rune also mentions Päivätär; after stating that Kavet allowed for the sun and the moon to shine, it said that the Son of the Sun was freed when Päivätär freed him. Ganander also said Kavet means a bird, an animal, or a creation of God.

Kave and Päivätär are, just like Kivutar and various other goddesses, mixed with Virgin Mary in runic songs. In the above cases, the Sun or Son of the Sun which were freed by Kave or Päivätär also got mixed with Christian imagery: the Virgin Mary freed and saved Jesus, or it was even Jesus who freed the Sun and the Moon. Similarly, Finnish Karelian songs describe that birchbark came from either Virgin Mary or Päivätär's scarf.

A Kainuu bear spell describes Kavet, "beautiful maiden of air", as the one who took a tooth which fell down from the clouds and attached it to a bear's gums. Kave also appears in multiple runic songs as she is asked to help a woman when she's giving birth, along with Ukko.

=== Forest Finnish myth ===
In Forest Finnish myth, plural kapeet ate the moon away every month and Rahko, someone who had committed suicide, forged a new moon from cow's hooves and fat. After being a Rahko for long enough, you'd become a kave, and a new Rahko took your place. This tradition aligns with Agricola's writings on kapeet, but not on Rahko.

== Epithets ==
| Epithet | Epithet meaning | Regions |
|---|---|---|
| Kaave eukko, luonnon tyttö | 'Kaave old woman, girl of nature' | Kainuu, North Savo, South Karelia |
| Kave eukko, vaimo vanhin | 'Kave old woman, the oldest woman' | North Karelia |
| Kavet, ilman kaunis neiti | 'Kavet, the beautiful air maiden' | Kainuu |
| Kaave kultainen korea Kave kultainen korea Kaveh kultainen koria | 'Kave golden [and] beautiful' | Kainuu, North Karelia, North Savo, South Karelia |
| Kavet, kultainen korento | 'Kavet, a golden dragonfly' | North Karelia |
| Kaveh eukko, luonnotar Kavet eukko, Luonnotar | 'Kaveh old woman, luonnotar' | North Karelia |
| Vanhin vaimoloista | 'the oldest of women' | Kainuu, North Karelia, South Karelia |
| Ensin ehtoista emoista Ensin emä itselöistä | 'first of generous mothers' | Kainuu, North Karelia, South Karelia |
| Paras luonnon tyttäristä | 'the best of the daughters of nature' | North Karelia |

== Kapeet or luonnottaret as a group ==
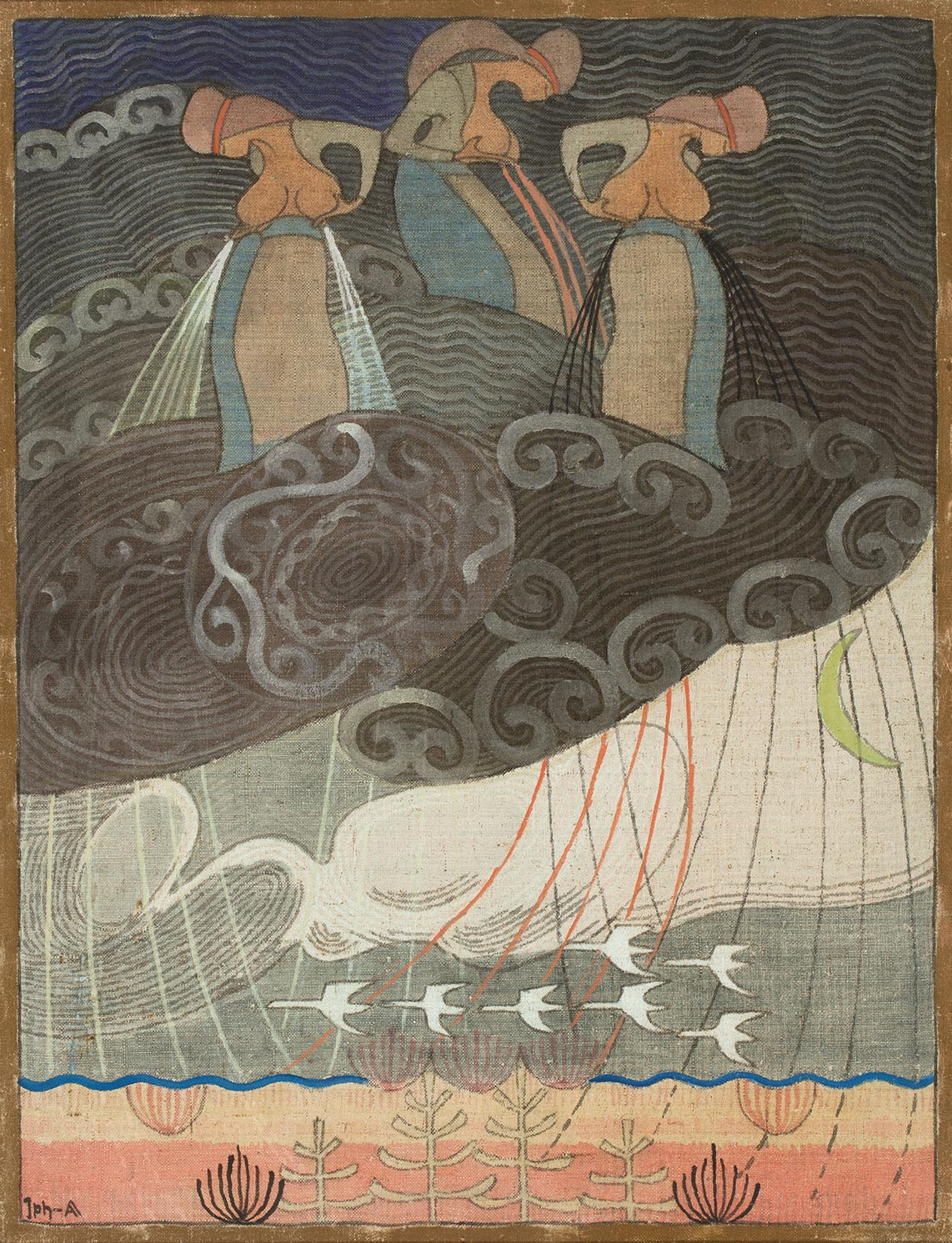
"Origin of Iron" by Joseph Alanen (1910–1912).

While Kave exists as a proper noun, its plural is also used to refer to a group of goddesses. In multiple poems, a Luonnotar trio also appears, which some researchers have connected to the Norse Norns, although luonnottaret's domain (nature) differs from that of the Norns. This trio is, for alliteration, sometimes also called a duo (kaksi kavetta) or a quartet (neljä neittä). A luonnotar trio is said to have milked from their breasts the milk that was made into iron (origin of iron), to have harvested a meadow the hays of which were burned (resulting in the Great Oak), and to have warned Lemminkäinen against going to Pohjola. The birch was made by the luonnotar trio; one rune even says humans were created by Kave, God, [and] the luonnotar trio.

Some goddesses included within this group are Etelätär, Kuutar, Otavatar and Päivätär. Osmotar is also called "a kave who brews beers" (kapo kaljojen panija) in a runic song. Some North Karelian runic songs also call Loviatar a luonnotar.

A non-specified kave, who sits on a cloud, is said to have milked healing balm from her breast, and is asked to weave a golden cloth.

== Old man Kave ==
Two runic songs, one written down from North Ostrobothnia (1789) and the other from South Savo (1819), mention 'Old man Kave, Lord of the North, / Ancient eternal giant, / Old father of Väinämöinen' (Kave ukko pohjan Herra, / Ikäinen iku Turilas, / Isä vanha Väinämöisen). He was born after ten years in the womb as a full warrior with a sword and a saddled stallion. A 1674 letter written by Johannes Cajanus stated that in Kainuu, Väinämöinen was called a son of a giant named Kaleva, and Lönnrot considered Kave ukko to be another name for Kaleva in his 1827 thesis De Väinämöine, priscorum fennorum numine.
