= Luonnotar =

Luonnotar may refer to:

- Kave (Finnish mythology), a goddess in Finnish mythology
- Ilmatar, a goddess in the Kalevala epic
- Luonnotar (Sibelius), a tone poem by Jean Sibelius
