= Kivutar =

Figure in Finnish mythology

- Maiden of Pains
- Other names: Kiputyttö, Vaivatar, Vaiviotar, Vammatar, Vammotar
- Gender: Female
- Ethnic group: Finns, Karelians

Kivutar (lit. 'Lady Pain'), Kiputyttö (lit. 'Pain Girl') or Vammatar (lit. 'Lady Injury') is a spirit or goddess in Finnish mythology who is asked to take the pains and injuries of humans to herself. She lives on Kipumäki/Kipuvaara ("Pain Hill") or Kipuvuori ("Pain Mountain"), and is often called a maiden of the underworld (Tuonen neito).

She is the remover of illnesses and ruler of pain who takes pains back to where they originate from.

== In runic songs ==
Kivutar appears in runic songs used as spells to alleviate some kind of pain, such as a burn wound or pain caused by a rock. She is typically described to be sitting on a pain rock (kipukivi) on Kipumäki, on a hill on Kipuvuori ("Pain Mountain"), which is at the confluence of three rivers or rapids. Pains can be moved into stones, as they don't feel pain, which she can gather for herself into a container or a glove, and even throw them in the pitch black sea. A runic song tradition connected to North Ostrobothnia and Kainuu also describes her as boiling pains in a pot.

Kainuu songs of the origin of iron state: "It is aching to be in pain, / Ailing to live in injury. / Pain belongs to Kivutar, / Ailment to the daughter of injury!" ("Kipiä on kivussa olla, / Vaiva vammassa elää. / Kipiä on Kivuttarelle, / Vaiva vamman tyttärelle!")

She also helped with the pains of giving birth.

== Interpretations ==
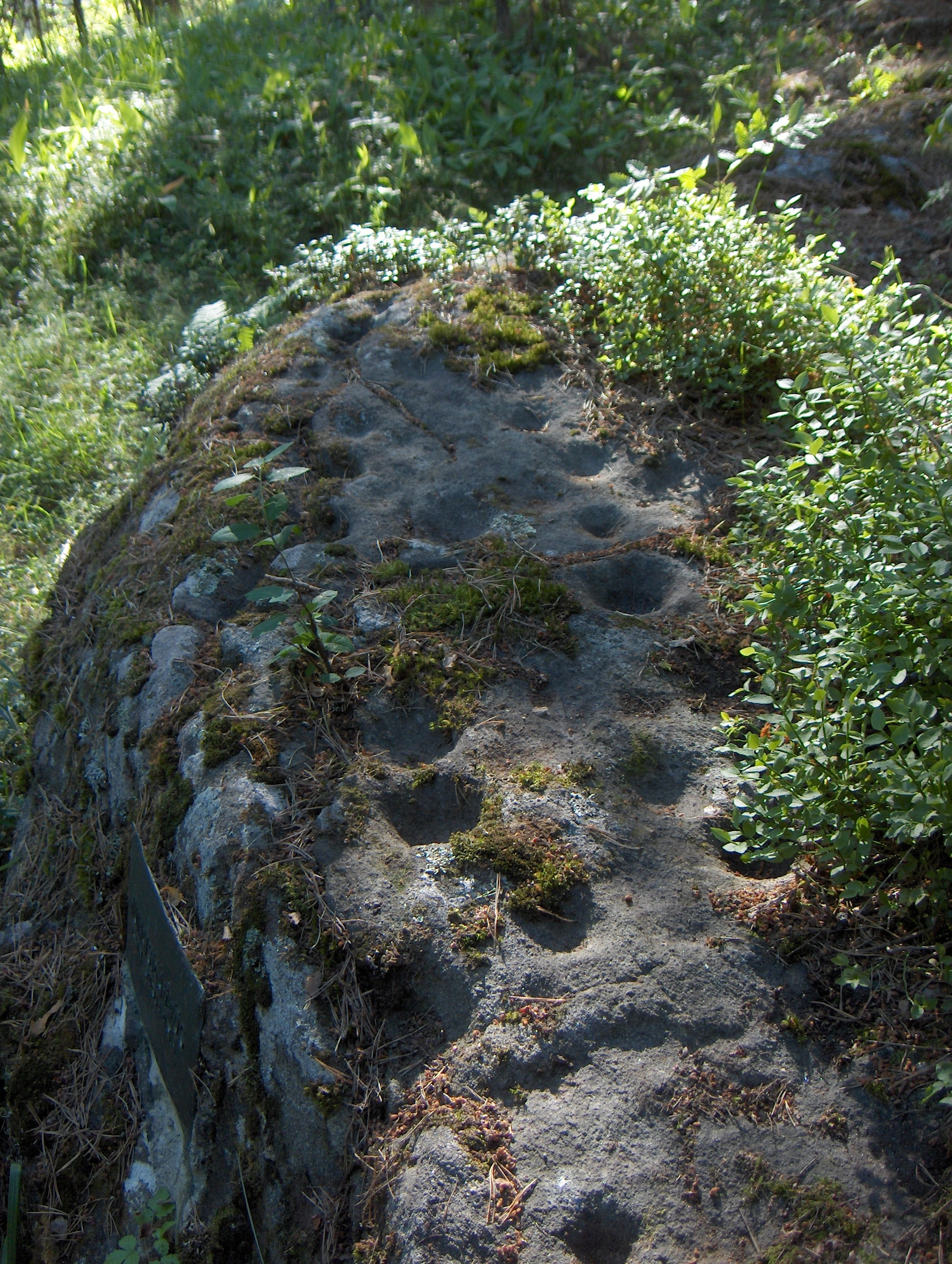
Cup marked stone in Hartola, Finland.

Christfried Ganander called Kivutar Väinämöinen's daughter and called Vaavutar or Vauvutar her sister. The former claim is based on the fact that Kivutar is called Väinän tytär ("daughter of Väinä"). Seto poetry also features this epithet (Väänä tütär) with the clear meaning of a "female inhabitant at the river Daugava" (in Finnish, Väinä river).

Kivutar has sometimes been mixed with Virgin Mary in runic songs due to Christian influence. Kaarle Krohn believed Kivutar was always Virgin Mary from the very beginning. Anna-Leena Siikala instead believed Kivutar existed in Finland before the arrival of Christian influence, and while she did get features associated with Mary, the idea of a mother of pain who lives in the underworld is common in Eurasian religions. She thought Kivutar had more in common with the Norse Menglöð than Mary. Martti Haavio believed she was a translation of something such as hē mḗtēr tōn pathēmátōn ("mother of pains"), who was sent by the Devil to harm people in a Byzantine spell. A 1514 Danish magic spell also mentions alle vndeskabs modher ("mother of all pains"), who in turn has been connected to Lilith.

The pain rock Kivutar sits on is said to have a hole in it which pain can be banished to. This is why it has been theorized the pain rock would mean a cup marked stone which were used for offerings in earlier tradition.

== Epithets ==
| Epithet | Epithet meaning | Regions |
|---|---|---|
| Kivutar, kipiä neito Kivutar kipuinen neito Kivutar, kipiä neitoh | 'Kivutar, painful maiden' | South Savo |
| Kivutar kipujen vaimo | 'Kivutar wife/woman of pains' | North Savo |
| Kivutar kipujen eukko Kivutar, kipuin eukko | 'Kivutar old woman of pains' | North Karelia, White Karelia |
| Kivutar kipuin neito Kivutar, kipeän neiti | 'Kivutar, maiden of pain(s)' | Kainuu, South Savo |
| Kivutar kauhia emäntä | 'Kivutar dreadful mistress' | Ostrobothnia, South Savo |
| Kivutar hyvä emäntä | 'Kivutar good mistress' | Forest Finns, Ladoga Karelia, North Karelia, White Karelia |
| Kipulan neito | 'Maiden of Kipula' | Ladoga Karelia, Ostrobothnia |
| Kipumäen iso emäntä | 'The Great Mistress of Kipumäki' | Ostrobothnia |
| Kiputyttö Tuonen neito Kiputyttö Tuonen neitsy Kiputyttö, Tuonen tyttö Kiputyttö, Tuonen neiti | 'Kiputyttö, Maiden of Tuoni' | Central Finland, Ingria, Kainuu, Ladoga Karelia, North Karelia, North Savo, Ostrobothnia, South Savo |
| Kiputyttö, tyyni neiti | 'Kiputyttö, calm maiden' | North Karelia |
| Kiputyttö, ilman neiti | 'Kiputyttö, maiden of air' | North Karelia |
| Kiputyttö, neiti Kiire; Kiputyttö, kiijän neiti | 'Kiputyttö, a maiden in a hurry' | Kainuu, Olonets Karelia, White Karelia; Note: Ganander explained "kiire" in this context to refer to kiirastuli ("purgatory") instead of hurry. |
| Kiputyttö, nuori neito | 'Kiputyttö, young maiden' | North Savo |
| Kiputyttö, vuoren neiti | 'Kiputyttö, maiden of mountain' | North Karelia |
| Kipunatar kiltti piika | 'Kipunatar kind maid' | Ladoga Karelia |
| Vaiviotar, vanha vaimo | 'Vaiviotar, old woman/wife' | Unknown |
| Vammatar valio vaimo | 'Vammatar outstanding wife/woman' | Ladoga Karelia, North Karelia, White Karelia |
