= Rahko =

Finnish mythological figure linked to the Moon

Rahko or Rahkoi is a figure in Finnish mythology. He was first mentioned in writing in 1551 by Mikael Agricola as someone who "split the Moon black" ("Rachkoi Cuun mustaxi jacoi"), so he has been connected to the waning of the Moon.

== Description ==
In 1551, Mikael Agricola mentioned Rahkoi as someone who "split the Moon black" ("Rachkoi Cuun mustaxi jacoi"), but also wrote that kapeet (singular kave) ate the Moon from ancient Finns.

In 1789, Christfried Ganander wrote that Rahkoi is a ghost who the Tavastians of old believed blackened the Moon. He mentioned Kuumet as someone with the same role, a demon who blackened the Moon by imprisoning it in an iron grain drying and threshing cabin (riihi). He specified that Agricola got it wrong: Kavet was someone who released the Moon instead of eating it.

In South Ostrobothnia, Rahko has meant a nightmare.

In Forest Finnish beliefs, kapeet ate the moon away every month and Rahko, someone who had committed suicide, forged a new moon from cow's hooves and fat. After being a Rahko for long enough, you'd become a kave, and a new Rahko took your place. This tradition aligns with Agricola's writings on kapeet, but not on Rahko.

The Sámi in Finland knew a figure called Mano-Rakko ("Rakko of the Moon"), who had been a thief who had gone up to the Moon to cover it in tar so its light wouldn't give him away. However, he got stuck and can still be seen on the Moon, a bucket of tar in one hand and a brush in the other. In North Ostrobothnia, this individual was called Rahkonen and was instead about to do nighttime courting. In South Ostrobothnia, it was said that Rahko-Matti was painting the Moon in tar.

== Name ==
Kaarle Krohn believed the word rahko means "chapping". The Veps people have a similar being who appears as a riihi haltija (rihenrahkoi) or an oven haltija (päčinrahkoi). If he was originally a haltija of fire or coals, his name could come from rahko ("a wooden shingle holder" = "pincers"). According to Janne Saarikivi, an oven haltija could've become the one who blackens the Moon, because a major source of the colour black, coal, was held with pincers.

== See also ==
- RAHKO: Shadows Around Us
