= Soini (mythology) =

Fictional giant from Finnish mythology

Soini is a giant and a son of Kaleva in Finnish mythology. Parts of a story which are attributed to him in North Ostrobothnia are instead given to Kullervo in some other regions, such as Ingria. Christfried Ganander wrote Soini was a trickster or scoundrel his whole life. He is often called Kalkki (Swedish skalk: scoundrel; Proto-West Germanic skalk: serf, servant, slave).

== In runic songs ==
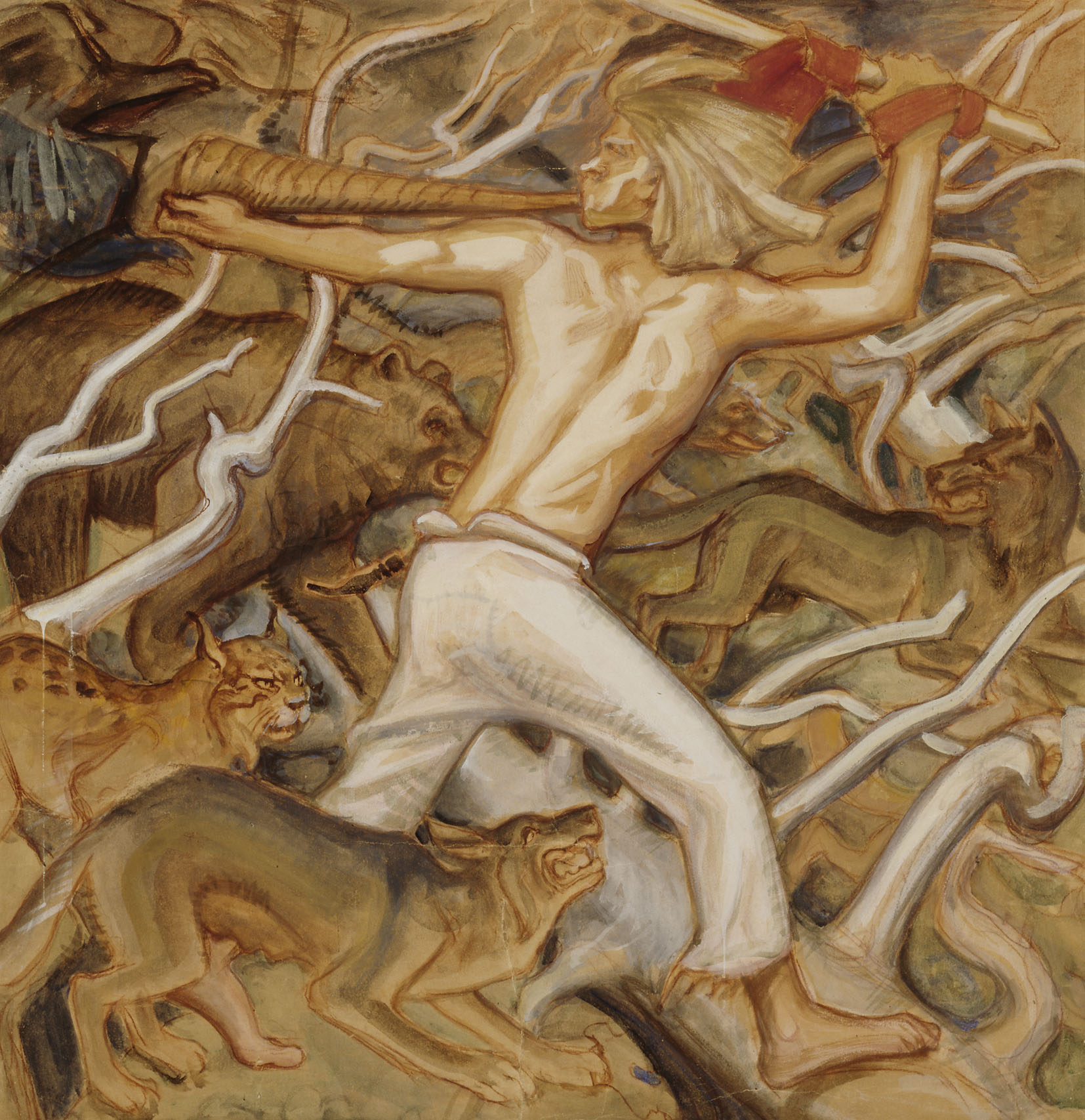
"Kullervo Herding his Wild Flocks" by Akseli Gallen-Kallela (1917). In some regions, Soini is the protagonist of this story instead of Kullervo.

When Soini was only three nights old, he tore his swaddling. As he was seen to be so strong, he was sold to Karelia to a smith named Köyrötyinen. When he was ordered to look after a child, he tore the child's eyes out, killed them with a disease and burned the cradle. He asked for a new job and was told to build a fence. He did by tying full grown spruces together with snakes and lizards. He asked for a new job and was told to herd cattle. The smith's wife gave him a bread which she had hidden a stone into. She told Soini not to eat it before the cattle is coming back home. He did, however, cut into the bread earlier, finding the stone. He was enraged and decided to enact revenge. He fed the cattle to bears, made a horn instrument out of cow bones, and led bears and wolves to the smith's home. He told the bears and wolves to rip apart the smith's wife's thigh, thus getting his revenge against her.

A Kainuu version of the story includes one more failed job: Soini was told to row with a fishnet. After doing this for three days, he grew angry and lifted up a pine tree from the ground with its roots and used it to ruin the net and the water and to push fishermen into the water.

The runic songs call him Soini-kulta ("darling Soini"), Sollu-kulta ("darling Sollu") or Solki-kulta ("darling Solki"). North Ostrobothnian songs also call him "kalkki son of Kaleva" ("kalkki Kalevan poika"), but Kainuu songs call him "the beautiful son of Kaleva" ("kaunis Kalevan poika").

Later, he created swiddens in North Ostrobothnia and Kainuu with his brother, Hiisi. The two of them could do it faster than a group of 10 men. In a Kainuu runic song, he was able to cut down as much forest with one shout as normal people could after a week's work. This is how he created the meadows of Liminka. If he wanted to visit his brother, he could row the Oulujoki river upstream.

== In folklore ==
Soini is said to have lived in Liminka, North Ostrobothnia, on the spot where now lies the Church of Liminka.
