= Hiisi =

Term in Finnic mythologies

Hiisi (Finnish pronunciation: [ˈhiːsi]; plural hiidet [ˈhiːdet]) is a term in Finnic mythologies, originally denoting sacred localities and later on various types of mythological entities.

In later, Christian-influenced folklore, they are depicted as demonic or trickster-like entities, often the autochthonous, pagan inhabitants of the land, similar in this respect to mythological giants. They are found near salient promontories, ominous crevasses, large boulders, potholes, woods, hills, and other outstanding geographical features or rough terrain.

== Origin and etymology ==
Hiisi was originally a spirit of hill forests (Abercromby 1898). In Estonian hiis (or his) means a sacred grove of trees, usually on elevated ground. In the spells ("magic songs") of the Finns the term Hiisi is often used in association with a hill or mountain, as a personage he also associated with the hills and mountains, such as the owner or ruler of the same. His name is also commonly associated with forests, and some forest animals.

More recent speculation, by Mauno Koski and others, associates the Finnish "Hiisi" and the Estonian "Hiis" primarily with burial sites, or sacred areas associated with burial sites; with a secondary meaning of hiisi applied to dominant, exceptional or anomalous geographical features. Following the Christianization of Finland and Estonia these meanings may have been lost or become unclear, which may have led to the application of anthropomorphism to hiisi sites, as "giant's ...", or the emergence of Hiisi or Hiis as a proper noun, the name of a deity or spirit.

It has been supposed that Hiisi's evil nature has been magnified over time, starting with the Christianization of Finland in the 12th and 13th centuries. In more recent times his nature has been nearly identical with that of a Christian devil, or even the Devil. In Bishop Mikael Agricola's list of Finnish pagan gods Hiisi is said to have been a god of forest game or fur, sharing this attribute with a similar god, Tapio.

=== Folklore ===
Oral folklore concerning hiisi mostly describes creatures that dwelt in hiisi sites, typically trolls or giants. Many of the stories describe how odd rock formations or other features of the landscape were created by the actions of these creatures.

Much of the recorded folklore about hiisi comes from the village of Narva in Vesilahti, Finland. There are tales of cauldrons of coins being caught by fishermen after having rolled down the cliff at Hiidennokka, as well as tales of how the cape of Hiidennokka was created by giants throwing rocks. One of these tales takes on a Christian element, as the giants throw rocks into the sea to prevent people going to church by boat.

Later the original aspect of nature's awesomeness inherent in the hiidet was diminished, and they passed into folklore as purely evil spirits vaguely analogous to trolls. According to this later view, hiidet were often small in size, but others were gigantic. Hiidet could travel in a noisy procession and attack people who did not give way to them. If somebody left their door open, a hiisi could come inside and steal something. If you were chased by a hiisi, you should seek safety in a cultivated area. In folklore, it was the cultivated areas that were blessed in contrast to the pagan holiness residing in the awesome and forbidding features of raw nature, and an evil hiisi could not step inside areas sanctified by cultivation.

==== Hiisi in North Ostrobothnia and Kainuu ====
In Pyhäjärvi, there are multiple place names referring to "hiisi". Stories give explanations to these names: Hiisi, a giant, grew sick of the noise humans who had moved nearby made. He broke his Hiidenlinna (Hiisi's castle) and flew away. However, he was carrying too much and was very heavy, so his toe dragged along the ground, creating the Pyhäjoki river. He had lived on Hiidenniemi (Hiisi's peninsula).

In Kainuu, Hiisi built his castle Hiidenlinna in Sotkamo and settled there. In 1674, Johannes Cajanus wrote a letter which described local folk beliefs, stating "Hijsi" to be a son of Kaleva. As the church of Sotkamo was built, Hiisi hated the sound of the church bells but had to eventually admit defeat, taking his animals and moving to the Hiidenportti (Hiisi's gate) ravine. Reindeer hunters promised to come to worship and sacrifice to Hiisi on the first weekend of July every year. This went on until the 1960s, although the style of celebration had changed into dancing and drinking in honour of the giant.

Once, Hiisi wanted to cross the Oulujärvi lake, but could not. He took earth from Paltamo and threw it into the lake. This resulted in the Manamansalo island and Kivesjärvi lake. In Liminka, there lived another son of Kaleva named Soini. When he wanted to visit his brother, he was so strong he could row the Oulujoki river upstream. The two brothers also created swiddens together faster than a group of 10 men could.

Two hills Hiisi has lived on according to folklore are Kivesvaara in Paltamo and Vuokatinvaara in Sotkamo.

=== Geographical objects and names ===
In 1933 a Finnish archaeologist, Aarne Michaël Tallgren, identified 15 or 16 potential Hiisi locations, and in 1967 a linguist, Mauno Koski, identified 14 Iron Age cemeteries as Hiisi sites. Both based their lists primarily on the presence of an element of the word hiisi in placenames. These locations include cup marked stones, sacred trees and springs. The term hiisi appears as a compound element in placenames such as Hiisimäki [hiisi hill].

The Finnish term for a prehistoric cairn grave is a hiidenkiuas [hiisi's sauna stove]. A giant's kettle is called a hiidenkirnu [hiisi's churn].

The settlement of Hiitola takes its name from the spirit.

== Linguistic usage ==
=== In "Magic Songs" ===
Numerous "Magic Songs" were catalogued by Lönnrot 1880 in the Suomen kansan muinaisia loitsurunoja, translated into English by Abercromby; these contain numerous references to "Hiisi" :

Hiisi was often used as a prefix in figurative expressions referring to certain things in Finnish life when casting spells ("magic songs")- for example for animals (in English): "Hiisi's bandy legs": a Hare; "braid of hair of Hiisi's girl", or "Hiisi's scourge": a Snake; "Hiisi's eye": A Lizard.; "Hiisi's bird": a Hornet;. The same was used for diseases and afflictions: "Hound of Hiisi": disease causing principle; "Hiisi's son", "Hiisi's cat": Toothache; "Hiisi's toadstool", "Hiisi's filth": tumors or swellings, etc. - the term "Hiisi" alone was also used for ailments, Tempo and Juntas's names were also used in similar contexts.

Hiisi's name was also used in curses - such as one against envy :

Whoever looks with envious glance, keeps turning round with jealous eye, causes bewitchment with his mouth, or imprecates with 'words,' may the slag of Hiisi fill his eyes, the soot of Hiisi soil his face, may a fiery bung plug up his mouth, may Lempo’s lock clinch fast his jaws, may his mouth get overgrown with moss, the root of his tongue be broken off, may one of his eyes like honey run, like butter may the other flow into the raging fire, into Hiisi’s bin of coals, may his head dry into stone and skin grow on the top.

— (Abercromby 1898a, p. 71)

In such incantations Hiisi's name often carries negative connotations, being associated with waste, pain, punishment and so on.

However, not all associations were negative - Hiisi is associated with good horses - in a song about travel : ".. good horses live at Hiisi’s place, on the mountains there are first-rate foals. From Hiisi take a horse, from the hard land a trotting horse, the chestnut nag of Hiisi with forelock of fire .. ". Hiisi was also assumed to assist forest hunters catching game. One folklore song gives Hiisi as the origin (creator) of the Horse, though (Abercromby 1898) claims this is a substitution and that he was originally associated with the Elk, Reindeer or Ox.

The name is also invoked in songs telling of the origins of parts of other creatures including the cat's tail, and the raven's neck, body, legs, and guts, and one of its eyes. One song tells of the snake's creation from the saliva of a sleeping Hiisi, which was eaten by Syöjätär - it burned and she coughed it out - once dried out Hiisi gave it life. (Note: This tale is also told in the Kalevala, Runo XXVI) (Tempo and Hiisi both appear in some forms of this creation text) The Aspen tree was also said to have come from Hiisi.

The Hornet (or wasp), closely associated with Hiisi (or Tempo) is a key element in the mythic creation of steel from iron - its sting - mistaken for honey by the smith Ilmarinen was used to harden the iron into steel - this poison was indicated as the origin of steel being used as a weapon against other people. (Note: This tale is also told in the Kalevala, Runo IX) One version of the origin of copper ore has it coming from the urine of Hilahatar (Hiisi's girl), his old woman, and his mare (horse).

=== Riddles ===
Hiisi's name was used in Finnish riddles - "Hiisi's elk" (or ".. with a hundred horns") is a pine tree; and "the neighing of Hiisi's horse in Hiisi's land" refers to thunder.

=== In the Kalevala ===
Except where noted, quotations in English are from the translation by Kirby 1907

There are many references to Hiisi in the Kalevala.

In Runo VI Joukahainen's bow has a drawstring made from the "elk of Hisi".

In Runo VII an evil spirit or agent called Hiisi is blamed for Väinämöinen's self-injury with his axe.

In Runo IX "Hiisi's cauldron" is mentioned as a vessel for creating enchantments.

Lemminkäinen is associated indirectly with Hiisi. He sometimes calls on Hiisi's aid, or others refer to the association as an insult. Hiisi's name is invoked in spells by Lemminkäinen. In Runo XI he silences a guard dog with the words "Stop the barker's mouth, O Hiisi", and in Runo XII, when he sings a spell calling forth warriors to aid him from the earth, the water and the forests he refers to those from the water as "Water-Hiisi". In Runo XI Lemminkäinen claims to have a sword with a "blade forged by Hiisi" and the same sword is mentioned in Runo XII as having been sharpened by Hiisi.

Lemminkäinen's pursuit of "Hiisi's elk" is the main quest in Runo XIII. The form of this elk fulfills a curse made earlier (lines 55-58), and it is constructed by Hiisi with a head of rotten wood, horns of willow, and other parts of sticks, reeds, and so on.

In Runo XIV Lemminkäinen is given the task of bridling the "fire-breathing steed of Hiisi".

In Runo XVII the giant Antero Vipunen refers to Väinämöinen, who has entered his stomach and is troubling him, as a Hiisi (line 169, 277), and as a "hound of Hiisi" (line 245), while Väinämöinen refers to Vipunen's stomach as "Hiisi's stable" (line 117).

In Runo XIX a field of serpents is said to have once been ploughed by Hiisi.

Runo XXVI includes the tale of the creation of snakes by Hiisi and Syöjätär.

In Runo XXVII the Mistress of Pohjola refers to Lemminkäinen as "scamp of Hiisi" (line 263).

In both Runo XXXIII and Runo L a woman is insulted as a "whore of Hiisi".

There are also figurative expressions such as "Bird of Hiisi" for a wasp (Runo IX).

There are some minor references that do not fit the pattern of references to evil spirits. In Runo XVIII, for instance, there is a line,"Gently barked the castle's Hiisi", though the text make it clear that is an ordinary dog (lines 476–550).

=== Associated terms ===
Hiitola is his home/homeland; Hippa his daughter, and Kipinatar his cat.

=== Modern language usage ===
Often, the English "goblin" is translated as "hiisi" in Finnish, due to the numerous similarities between the typical goblin and hiisi. In the Finnish translations of the works of J.R.R. Tolkien, where the word "goblin" is a synonym for "Orc", hiisi is used as the translation for "goblin", whereas "orc" is translated as "örkki".

In modern Finnish, hiisi and its derivatives hitto and hittolainen are mild profanities. The Finnish name for the Estonian island Hiiumaa is Hiidenmaa, or "land of Hiisi".

In the video game Noita a faction of hostile NPCs are referred to as The Hiisi.

In the Swedish fantasy drama Border (2018), the troll character Vore lays an unfertilized egg that he calls a "hiisit". He says it is a changeling.

An island in the Nod-Krai region in the video game Genshin Impact is named "Hiisi Island", along with similarly inspired Lempo and Paha Isles, found in the Kalevala

== See also ==
- Hiis (Estonian) still carries the primary meaning of a sacred grove.
- Lempo, devil type figure in Finnish folklore and myth
- Piru, evil spirit in Finnish folklore
- Sampo Lappelill defies Hiisi the Mountain King

== Citations and references ==
=== Sources cited ===
- Abercromby, John (1898), The Pre-and Proto- Historic Finns: Both Eastern and Western, with the Magic Songs of the West Finns, vol. 1
- Abercromby, John (1898a), The Pre- and Proto- Historic Finns: Both Eastern and Western, with the Magic Songs of the West Finns, vol. 2
- Kirby, William Forsell, ed. (1907), Kalevala: The Land of Heroes, vol. 1 , e-text via www.gutenberg.org
- Kirby, William Forsell, ed. (1907), Kalevala: The Land of Heroes, vol. 2 , e-text via www.gutenberg.org
- Wessman, Anna (2009), "Iron Age Cemeteries and Hiisi Sites: Is There a Connection?" (PDF), Folklore, 42, doi:10.7592/FEJF2009.42.wessman
