= Väinämöinen =

Main character in the Finnish national epic Kalevala

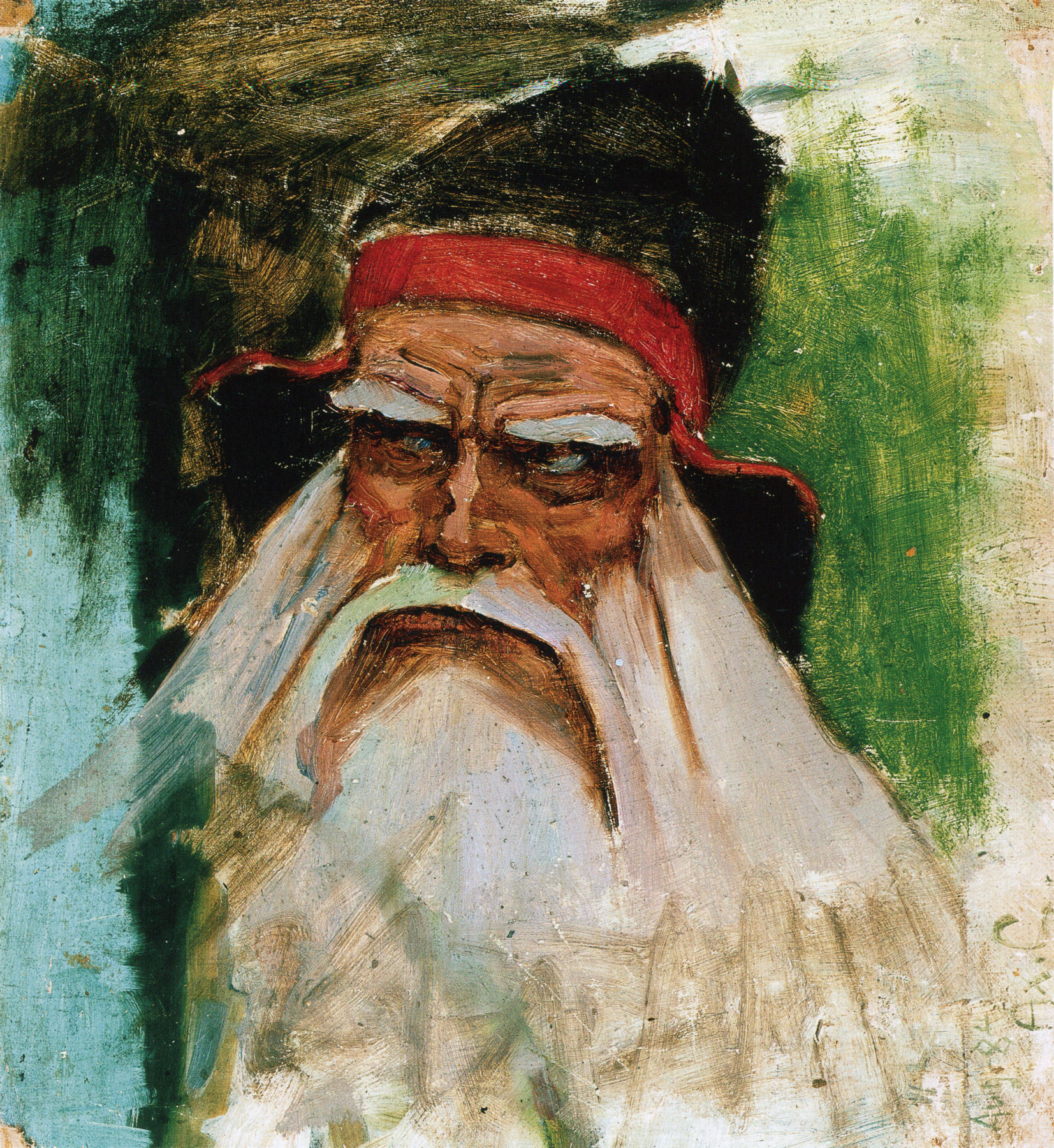
- Head of Väinämöinen by Akseli Gallen-Kallela, 1895
- Symbol: Water, sword and paddle
- Ethnic group: Finns, Karelians
- Parents: Kaleva (father) (Note: Father of Väinämöinen as stated by Cajanus in 1674, SKVR XIII1 1431, SKVR I3 2014, SKVR VII1 57, SKVR I4 334); Sea giant and Maiden of North (SKVR XII1 2); Ilmatar impregnated by waves (Kalevala)

Väinämöinen (Finnish pronunciation: [ˈʋæi̯næˌmøi̯nen]) is a demigod, hero and the central character in Finnish folklore and the main character in the national epic Kalevala by Elias Lönnrot. Väinämöinen was described as an old and wise man, and he possessed a potent, magical singing voice.

== Name ==
The name Väinämöinen has often been explained as coming from the Finnish word väinä 'stream pool' or väineä 'slow'. Janne Saarikivi hypothesized that the name was possibly connected to early Germanic forms of Odin's name: *wātenos could have been loaned into Proto-Karelian as *vätnä or *väinä, and Auðunn could be compared to Äinemöinen.

== In Finnish mythology ==
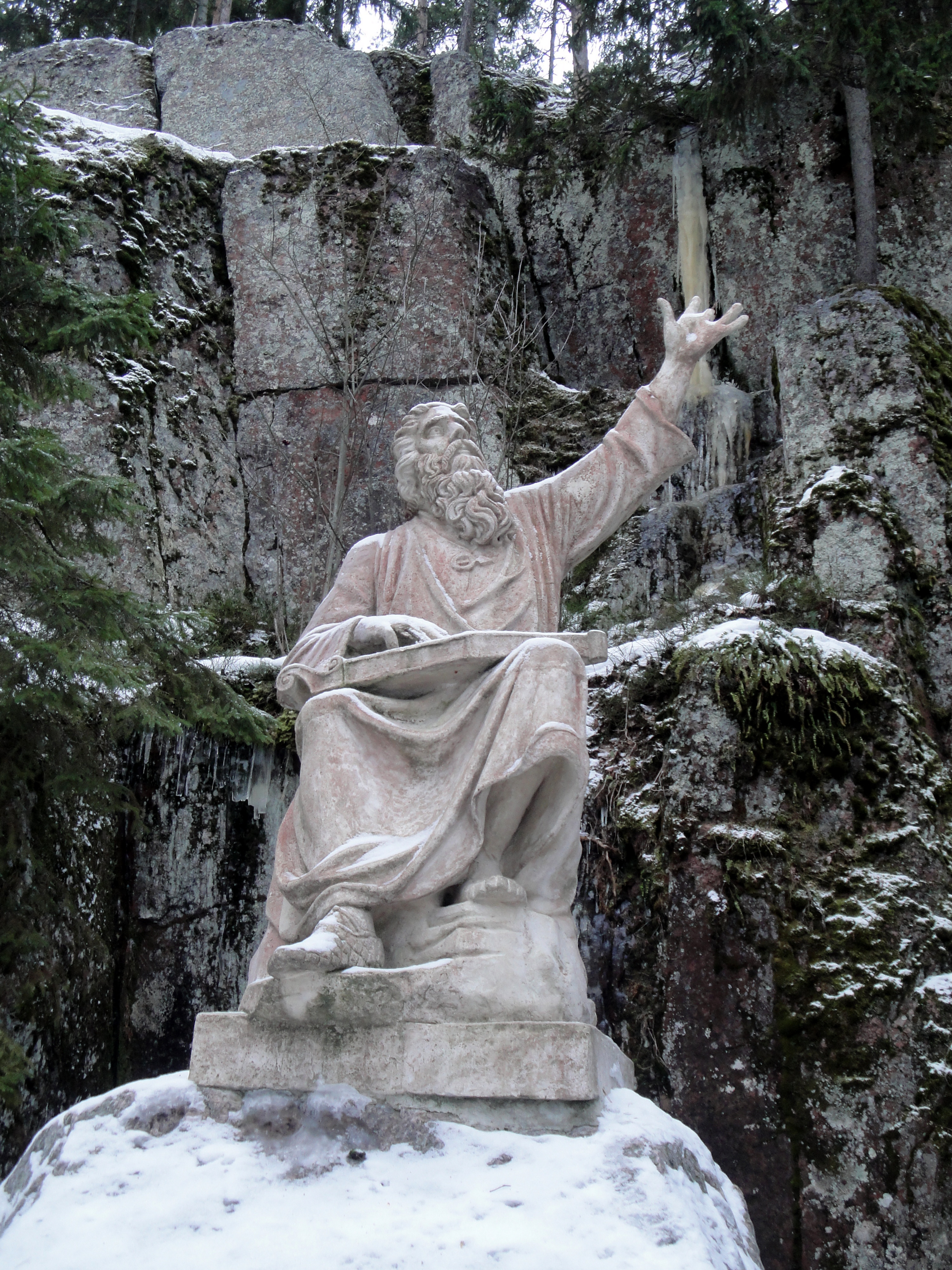
The Väinämöinen monument in Vyborg, in January 2015

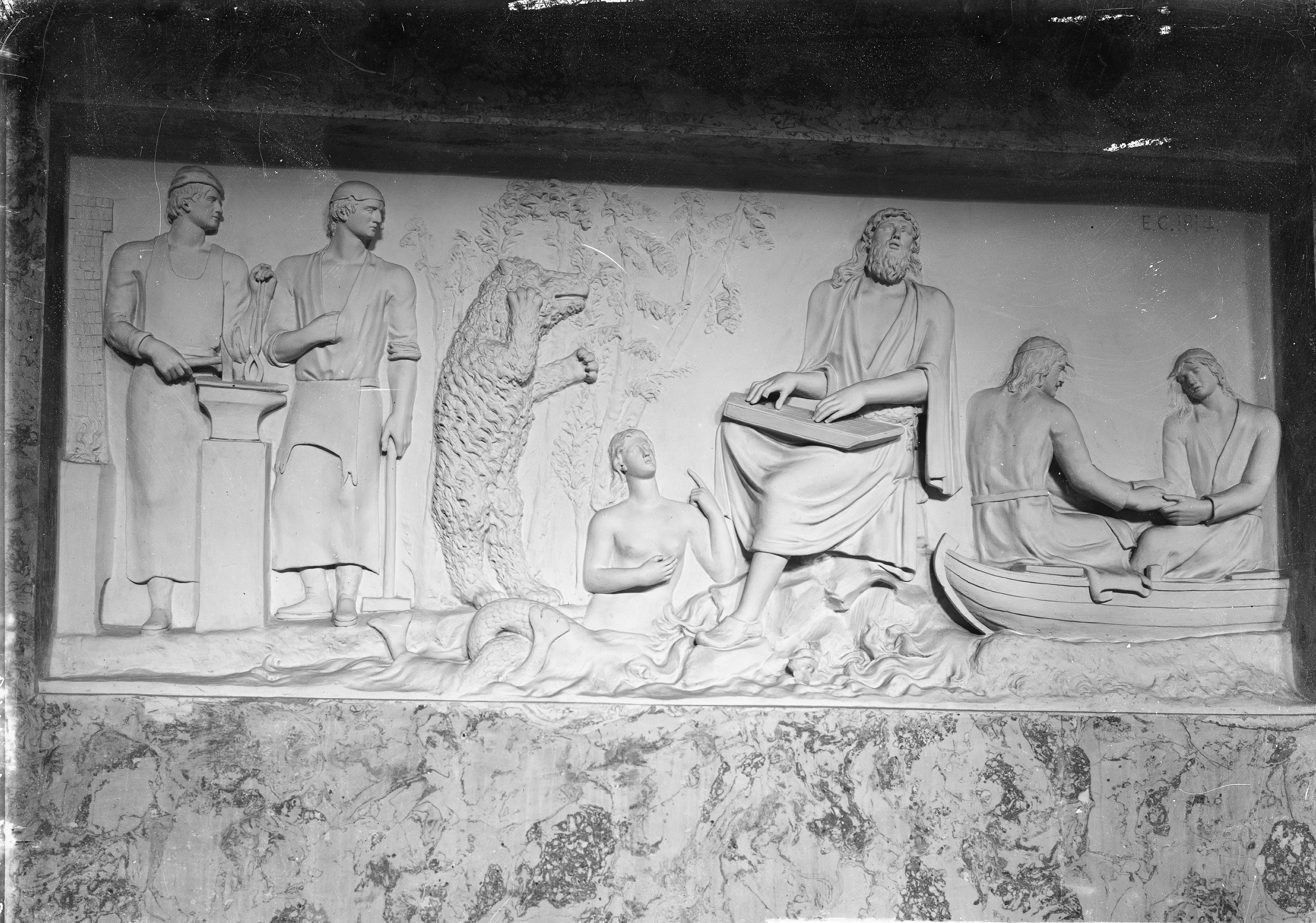
Väinämöinen Plays Kantele, an 1814 relief by Erik Cainberg that is considered to be the first visual depiction of Väinämöinen

The first extant mention of Väinämöinen in literature is in a list of Tavastian gods by Mikael Agricola in 1551, where it says: "Aeinemöinen wirdhet tacoi." (lit. '"Väinämöinen forged the chants."') He and other writers described Väinämöinen as the god of chants, songs and poetry; in many stories Väinämöinen was the central figure at the birth of the world.

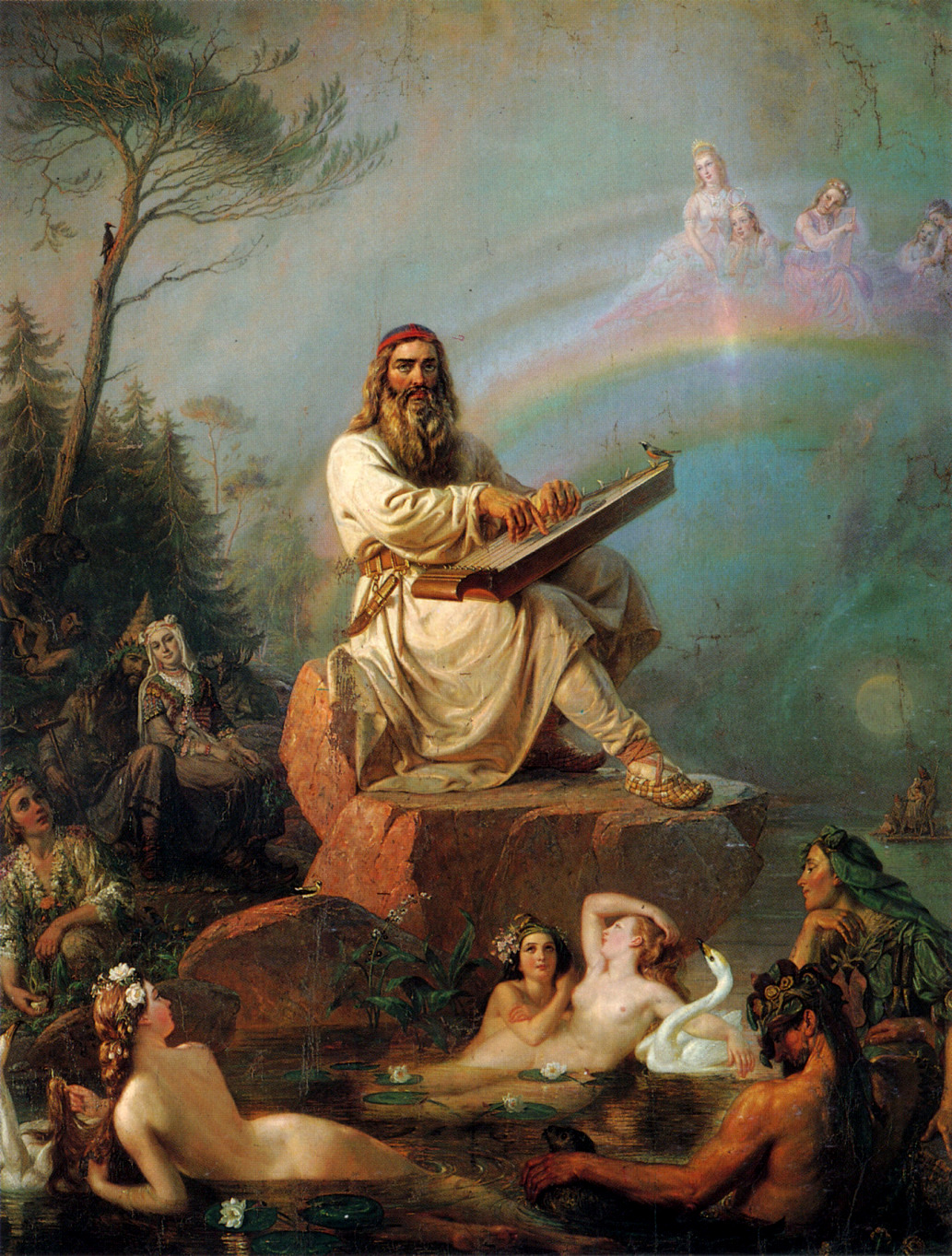
Väinämöinen's Play (fi) by Robert Wilhelm Ekman, 1866

A 1674 letter written by Johan Cajanus stated that in Kainuu, Väinämöinen was called a son of a giant named Kaleva. According to Christfried Ganander in 1789, Kaleva had 12 sons, but the only ones he named in addition to Väinämöinen were Ilmarinen, Hiisi, Soini, Liekiöinen and Kihovauhkonen. Joukahainen is also sometimes mentioned to be Väinämöinen's brother, though this is not the case in all versions. Väinämöinen's birth is a rare topic in runic songs, but a rare Ostrobothnian song describes him having been born from the Maiden of the North, who was impregnated by a sea giant. In another song, his father is said to be Kave-ukko, Lord of the North, who is described like a great warrior.

Väinämöinen has often been described as a shaman hero, a mythical tietäjä, with magical abilities, secret knowledge and being the most skilled singer. There is an old myth of his katabasis (journey to the underworld). He does also possess more armed warrior-like features especially in runic songs from Ostrobothnia. He is not only a rune singer, but a skilled smith and sword user as well.

Väinämöinen is the undisputed protagonist of Ostrobothnian runic songs collected in the 18th century. The myths around him include him trying to propose to an Air Maiden or Tuulikki, trying to build a boat as a task she gave him and accidentally hurting his knee, causing it to bleed. This is also known as the Finnish flood myth. In another well attested myth, Väinämöinen goes on a journey on his boat, creates the Kantele and plays it so well even goddesses show up to listen to it. Väinämöinen travelling to the underworld Tuonela, a common myth in Karelia, is missing from Ostrobothnia and rare in the nearby Kainuu; and even in Kainuu, the protagonist of the myth is named Kaukomieli. In Kainuu, Väinämöinen is more likely to travel to Pohjola, which also has the synonym Manala (the underworld, the same as Tuonela).

In Savonia, the well attested Väinämöinen-related runic songs include creating and playing the Kantele, Väinämöinen hurting his knee, as well as the runic singing battle between Väinämöinen and Joukahainen. The myths of stealing the sampo and travelling to the dead shaman Antero Vipunen were also present. Sometimes, Väinämöinen is also put as the forger of the golden maiden, though the protagonist in this story is often Ilmarinen. Väinämöinen is also seen as the ruler of water in Savonia.

Väinämöinen is often set as the protagonist of a myth where he communicates with the dead shaman Antero Vipunen by talking to him at his grave, travelling to the underworld to meet him, or being swallowed by him, in order to gain knowledge of specific magic words he is missing. According to Matti Kuusi, the original protagonist of the story was likely Lemminkäinen.

In Karelia, Väinämöinen is involved with events before the creation of the world in the following ways: He is shot down into the sea by an enemy (like Joukahainen) where he lies with his knee on the surface. A bird lays an egg on Väinämöinen's knee, and when Väinämöinen moves it, the eggs fall down and break, forming the earth and the sky. Väinämöinen's element is water, and he is widely connected to it in many regions. When he lies down in water in Karelian runic songs, he also forms the shapes of the bottom of the sea.

In all of the above mentioned regions, Väinämöinen defeats Joukahainen in a runic singing battle with his superior knowledge over the events in the beginning of the world; after all, it was Väinämöinen himself who formed the bottom of the sea, set the stars in the sky and created mountains. Joukahainen, younger and thus less knowing, only remembers that these things had happened but didn't make them happen himself. Väinämöinen proceeds to sing (spellcast) Joukahainen into a bog or cold water, which symbolize a path to the underworld.

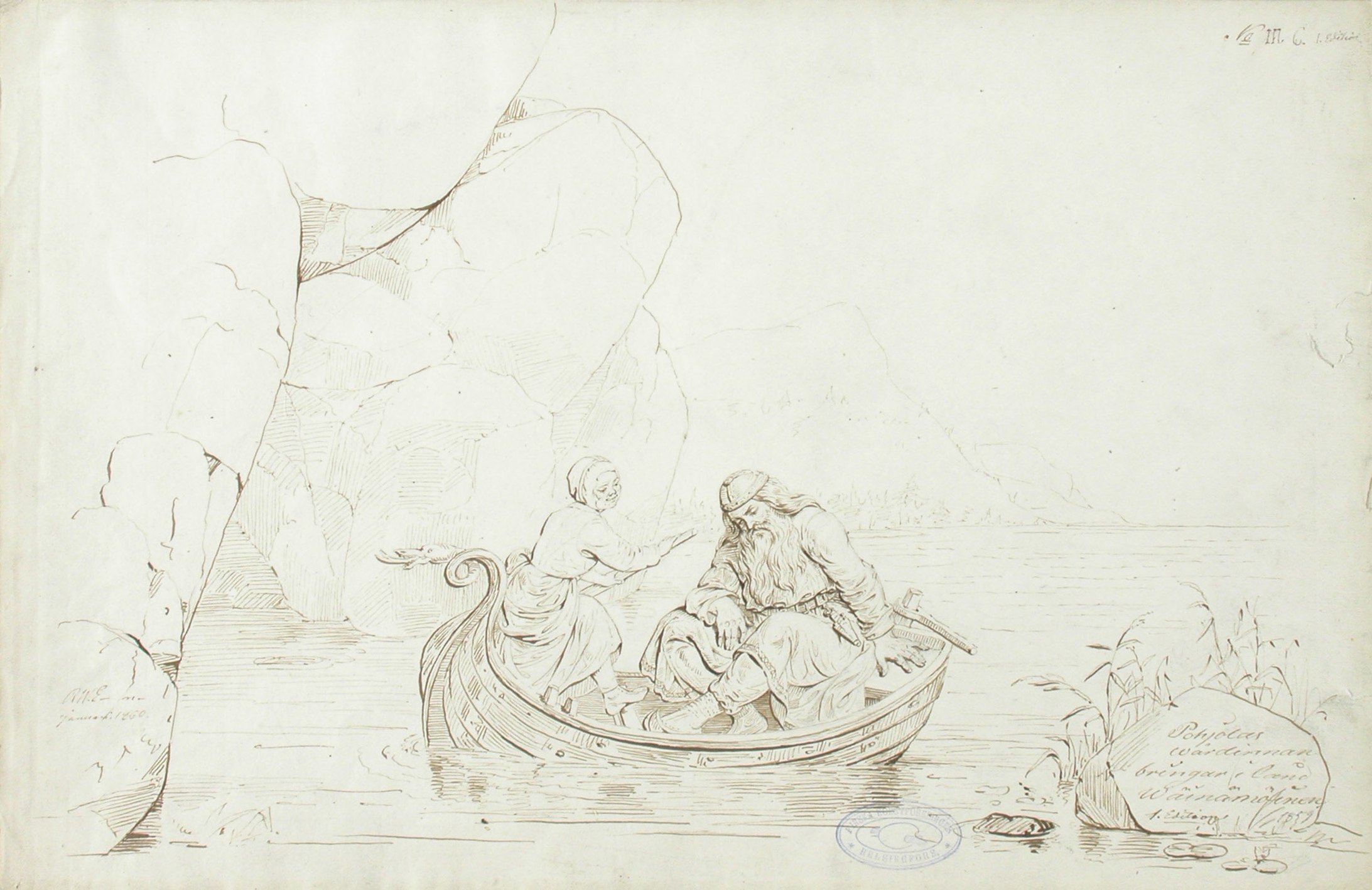
"Louhi saves Väinämöinen" by Robert Wilhelm Ekman (1859–1860)

Multiple different takes on Louhi exist in runic songs. In a song from South Savo, she is from Ostrobothnia and marries Väinämöinen, who is from Savonia and takes her there. This is why she is called Väinätär. She has a son, and when he is 15 years old, she sends him to bring her inheritance from Ostrobothnia with the help of a black dog she also gave birth to. In this version, Lovehetar had a daughter, and this daughter was the one who got impregnated in water. Giving birth to a black dog is a symbol of ultimate evil, since in European tradition, a black dog is a form of the Devil.

In a song from Kainuu, Louhi is not married, but her relation to Väinämöinen is still not adversarial: after Väinämöinen was shot and he drifted to Pohjola with the River of Tuoni, Mistress of Pohjola hears his cries and recognizes them to be those of a hero. She helps him by bringing him to her house and giving him food. In White Karelian songs, after hearing his cries, she instead promises to give him a maiden to marry if he forges for her the sampo.

In a myth where the Sun has been captured and hidden, Väinämöinen tends to play a crucial part. While there are multiple different versions of the myth where the hero candidates range from Jesus to a smith's maiden, in Kainuu, the sun and the moon were imprisoned in a rock and were released when Väinämöinen was forging. In Border Karelia, Väinämöinen allowed the sun to shine after catching it from the top of a pine tree. In Ingria, Son of God resurrects Väinämöinen and asks where the sun and the moon are, or he travels to Pohjola, where Mistress of Pohjola shows him to Väinämöinen's grave and he digs him up to ask the question.

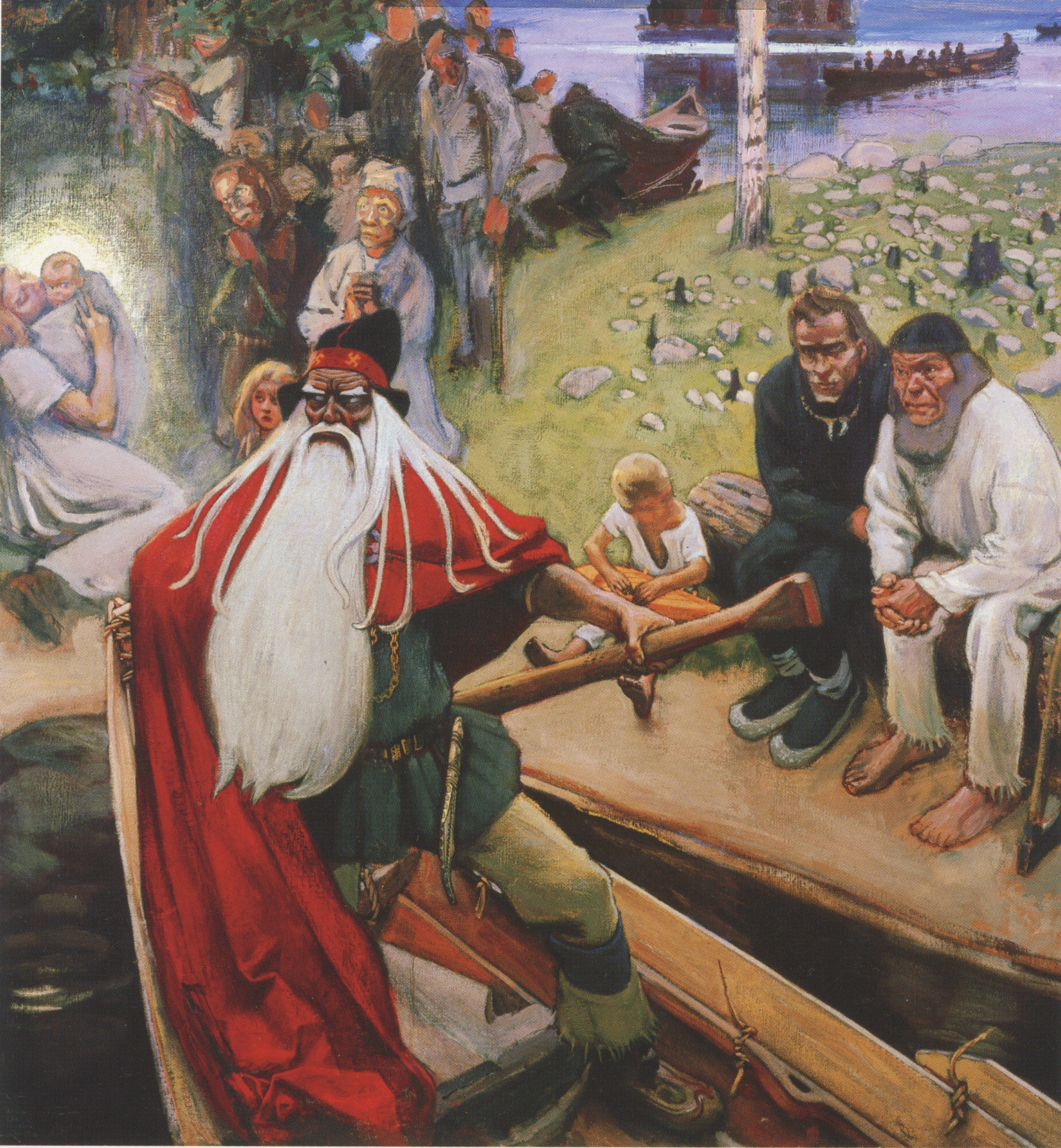
The Departure of Väinämöinen, Gallen-Kallela, 1906

In addition to his heroic acts, Väinämöinen is unlucky with some of his other efforts. He is often described as not being successful with fishing or courting. He says an old person should not try to marry a young person—based on his own failures. He cries when hurting his knee or falling into the sea, the latter to which Mistress of Pohjola remarks it as unusual to hear an old bearded hero crying. He is sometimes said to be blind. In the Medieval runic song Väinämöinen's Judgement (Finnish: Väinämöisen tuomio), a child who was born through a virgin birth from Marjatta accuses Väinämöinen of incest with his mother. The latter part is, according to Kaarle Krohn and Uno Harva, influenced by the ideas present in Sampsa Pellervoinen's story. According to Martti Haavio, the original context of this song is the child accusing Väinämöinen of being his father, having lied with the child's mother instead of his own. The child cannot be named because his father is not known, and tradition states that the name must be found from names of the family ancestors. As nobody admitted to being the child's father, Väinämöinen as a judge stated the child should be taken into the forest and killed; killing a child before it had been named and therefore taken as a member of the community was seen as acceptable. Magically, the newborn child starts speaking, declaring Väinämöinen himself to be his father. The child is made the king of northern fur hunting lands and possibly named Kaukomieli or Kaukamoinen. The ashamed Väinämöinen, on the other hand, sails into a whirlpool.

Some runic singers thought this meant the death of Väinämöinen, while others believed he was still alive and would return one day, real death still waiting for him in the future. Folklore widely knows of stories where one or multiple sons of Kaleva sailed away from Finland on a red boat or stone after the arrival of Christianity and priests. According to Gustaf Anton Brakel, Väinämöinen created a skerry in Pirkkala in order to be able to escape from the Swedes. Thus, the story of the departure of Väinämöinen was known from Western Finland to Karelia. Finnish runic songs further make references to Väinämöinen's "secret son" and act of adultery. In a Forest Finnish runic song, Väinämöinen gets his arm cut off on a turning wheel, and his "secret son" is asked to stop the bleeding. Ganander stated that the mother of this son was a mermaid in a mariage de conscience with Väinämöinen.

== Epithets ==
Epithet	Epithet meaning	Regions
Vaka vanha Väinämöinen	'Steadfast old Väinämöinen'	Central Finland, Ingria, Kainuu, Ladoga Karelia, North Karelia, North Ostrobothnia, North Savo, Olonets Karelia, Rear Bothnia, South Karelia, South Savo, White Karelia
Ukko vanha Väinämöinen	'Old man Väinämöinen'	Ladoga Karelia, North Karelia, Olonets Karelia, Ostrobothnia, Päijät-Häme, Rear Bothnia, South Karelia, White Karelia
Pätösen poika	'Son of the Sun'	Central Finland, Kainuu, North Karelia, North Ostrobothnia, North Savo, Olonets Karelia, Rear Bothnia, South Savo, White Karelia
Pyhä uro	'Holy Hero'	Kainuu, North Ostrobothnia, North Savo, Olonets Karelia, Rear Bothnia, White Karelia
Pätösen uro	'Hero of the Sun'	Olonets Karelia
Tietäjä iänikuinen	'Eternal seer'	Ladoga Karelia, North Karelia, Olonets Karelia, South Savo, White Karelia
Laulaja iänikuinen	'Eternal singer'	White Karelia
Kalevan poika	'Son of Kaleva'	Ingria, North Karelia, South Karelia, White Karelia
Ukko Kalevan vanhin	'Old man, Kaleva's eldest'	White Karelia
Suvannon sulho	'Stream pool's bridegroom'	North Karelia, South Savo, White Karelia
Ulappalan umpisilmä	'Ulappala's closed eye'	Kainuu
Ukko Väinälän sokea	'Väinälä's blind old man'	Kainuu, North Karelia
Väinälän vähänäköinen	'Väinälä's little-seeing one'	North Karelia

== In the Kalevala ==
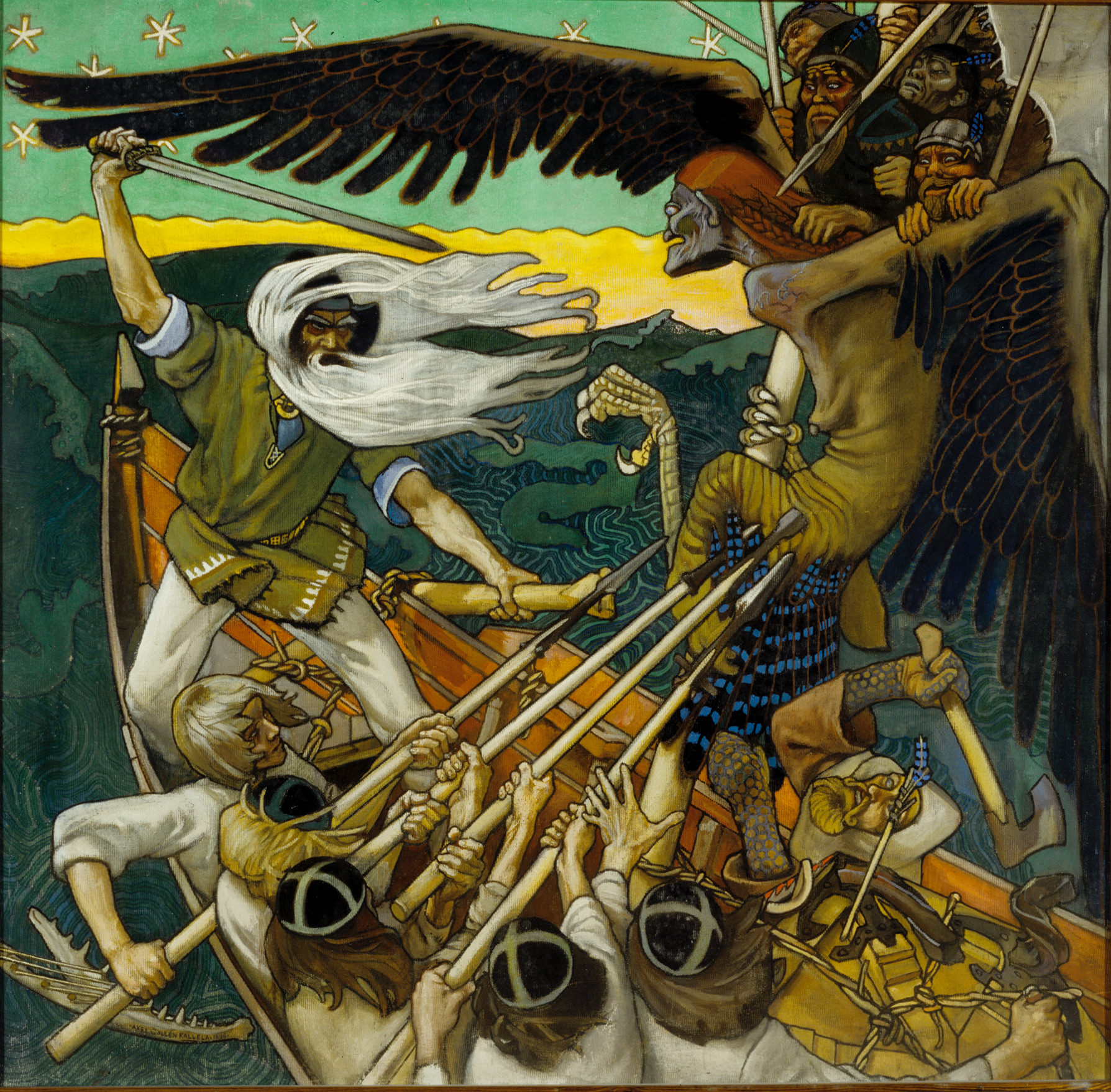
The Defense of the Sampo (1896) by Gallen-Kallela, showing Väinämöinen with a sword defending the Sampo from Louhi.

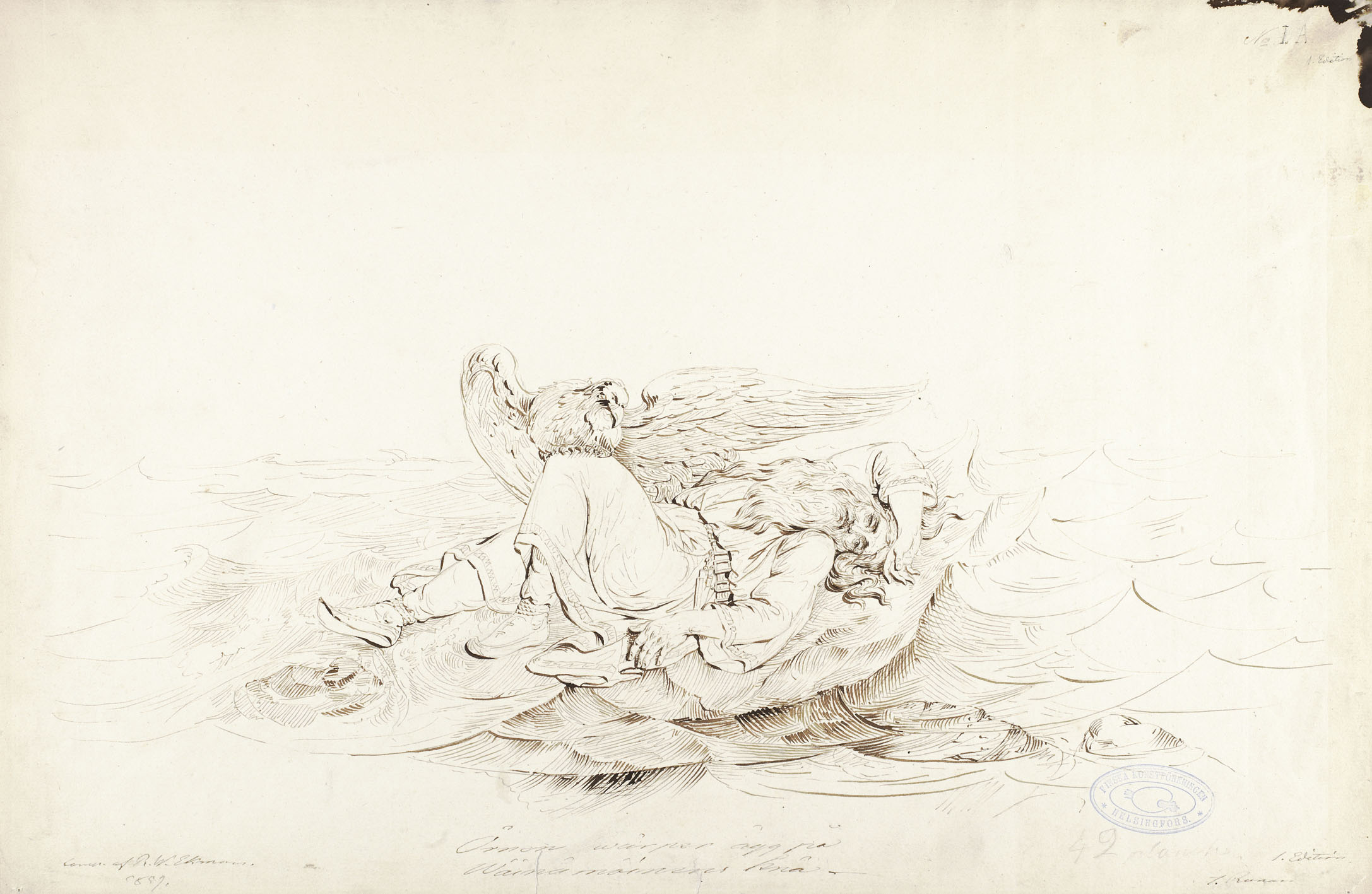
In the Old Kalevala (1835), an eagle laid its eggs on the knee of Väinämöinen, unlike in the standard New Kalevala (1849) where a goldeneye lays its eggs on the knee of Ilmatar. (Drawing by Robert Wilhelm Ekman, 1859)

In the nineteenth century, some folklorists, most notably Elias Lönnrot, the writer of Kalevala, disputed Väinämöinen's mythological background, claiming that he was an ancient hero, or an influential shaman who lived perhaps in the ninth century. Stripping Väinämöinen from his direct godlike characteristics, Lönnrot turned Väinämöinen into the son of the primal goddess Ilmatar, whom Lönnrot had invented himself. In this story, it was she who was floating in the sea when a duck laid eggs on her knee. He possessed the wisdom of the ages from birth, for he was in his mother's womb for seven hundred and thirty years, while she was floating in the sea and while the earth was formed. It is after praying to the sun, the moon, and the great bear (the stars, referring to Ursa Major) that he is able to leave his mother's womb and dive into the sea.

Väinämöinen is presented as the 'eternal bard', who exerts order over chaos and established the land of Kaleva, and around whom revolve so many of the events in Kalevala. His search for a wife brings the land of Kaleva into, at first friendly, but later hostile contact with its dark and threatening neighbour in the north, Pohjola. This conflict culminates in the creation and theft of the Sampo, a magical artifact made by Ilmarinen, the subsequent mission to recapture it, and a battle which ends up splintering the Sampo and dispersing its parts around the world to parts unknown.

Väinämöinen also demonstrated his magical voice by sinking the impetuous Joukahainen into a bog by singing. Väinämöinen also slays a great pike and makes a magical kantele from its jawbones. Louhi at one point saves Väinämöinen's life. Väinämöinen has a magical fire sword, crafted by Ilmarinen, which shines like the sun and is extraordinarily sharp with a golden handle.

Väinämöinen's end is a hubristic one. The 50th and final poem of the Kalevala tells the story of the maiden Marjatta, who becomes pregnant after eating a berry, giving birth to a baby boy. This child is brought to Väinämöinen to examine and judge. His verdict is that such a strangely born infant needs to be put to death. In reply, the newborn child, mere two weeks old, chides the old sage for his sins and transgressions, such as allowing the maiden Aino, sister of Joukahainen, to drown herself. Following this, the baby is baptized and named king of Kalevala. Defeated, Väinämöinen goes to the shores of the sea, where he sings for himself a boat of copper, with which he sails away from the mortal realms. In his final words, he promises that there shall be a time when he shall return, when his crafts and might shall once again be needed. Thematically, the 50th poem thus echoes the arrival of Christianity to Finland and the subsequent fading into history of the old pagan beliefs. This is a common theme among epics, for in the tale of King Arthur, Arthur declares a similar promise before departing for Avalon.

In the original 1888 translation of Kalevala into English by John Martin Crawford, Väinämöinen's name was anglicised as Wainamoinen.

== In other cultures ==
In the Estonian national epic Kalevipoeg, a similar hero is called Vanemuine. In neighbouring Scandinavia, Odin shares many attributes with Väinämöinen, such as connections to magic and poetry.

== Popular culture ==
The Kalevala has been translated into English and many other languages, in both verse and prose, in complete and abridged forms. For more details see list of Kalevala translations.

=== J. R. R. Tolkien ===
Väinämöinen has been identified as a source for Gandalf, the wizard in J. R. R. Tolkien's novel The Lord of the Rings. Another Tolkienian character with great similarities to Väinämöinen is Tom Bombadil. Like Väinämöinen, he is one of the most powerful beings in his world, and both are ancient and natural beings in their setting. Both Tom Bombadil and Väinämöinen rely on the power of song and lore. Likewise, Treebeard and the Ents in general have been compared to Väinämöinen.

=== Akseli Gallen-Kallela ===
In art (such as the accompanying picture by Akseli Gallen-Kallela), Väinämöinen is described as an old man with a long white beard, which is also a popular appearance for wizards in fantasy literature.

=== Music ===
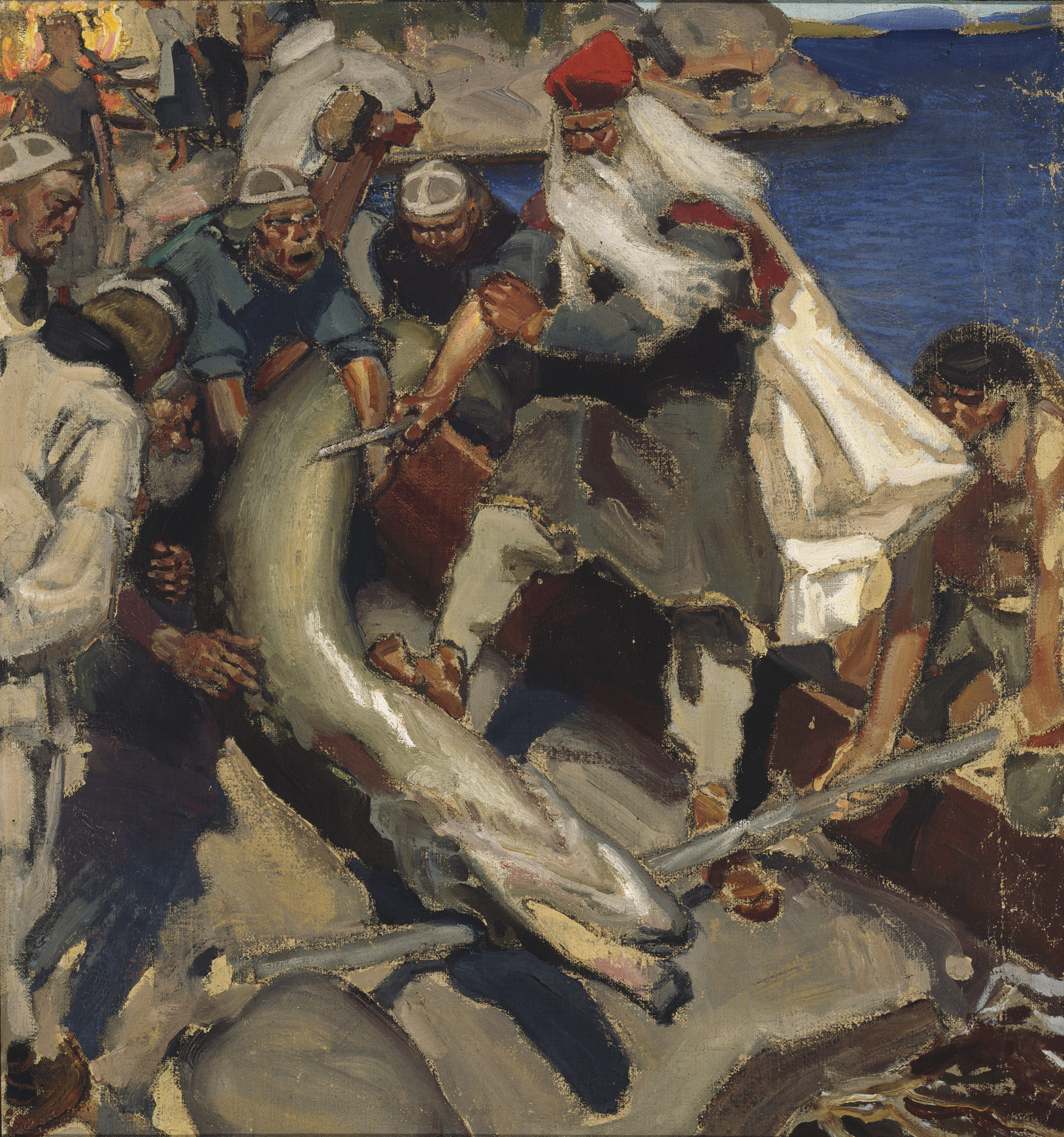
Väinämöinen kills a pike, from whose jawbones he later makes the first kantele

In music, Finnish folk metal band Ensiferum wrote three songs based on/about Väinämöinen, called "Old Man", "Little Dreamer" and "Cold Northland". There is also a direct reference to him in their song "One More Magic Potion", where they have written "Who can shape a kantele from a pike's jaw, like the great One once did?". The band's mascot, who appears on all their albums, also bears a similarity to traditional depictions of Väinämöinen. Another Finnish metal band named Amorphis released their tenth album The Beginning of Times in 2011. It is a concept album based on the myths and stories of Väinämöinen. Yet another well-known Finnish metal band, Korpiklaani has released a song about the death of Väinämöinen, Tuonelan Tuvilla, as well as an English version named "At The Huts of the Underworld". A song on the album Archipelago by Scottish electronic jazz collective Hidden Orchestra is also named "Vainamoinen". Philadelphia based Black metal band Nihilistinen Barbaarisuus released a song about Väinämöinen simply called "Väinämöinen" on their second studio album The Child Must Die in 2015. In classical music, Väinämöinen appears as the main character in the first movement of Jean Sibelius' original music for the "Days of the Press" celebrations of 1899. The first tableaux in this music known as Väinämöinen's Song later became the first movement of Sibelius' 1911 orchestral suite Scènes Historiques. Väinämöinen is also the theme of a composition for choir and harp by Zoltán Kodály, "Wainamoinen makes music", premiered by David Watkins.

=== Science fiction and fantasy ===
Joan D. Vinge's The Summer Queen contains characters named Vanamoinen, Ilmarinen, and Kullervo. They are not the characters from the legend though but may have been inspired by them. That book is the sequel to her Hugo Award-winning novel The Snow Queen.

Väinämöinen is also a major character in The Iron Druid Chronicles novel, Hammered by Kevin Hearne. The series follows the Tempe, Arizona-based 2,100 year-old Irish Druid, Atticus O'Sullivan. This book's main plot is the ingress of several characters - the Slavic thunder god Perun, O'Sullivan, a werewolf, a vampire, Finnish folk legend Väinämöinen, and Taoist fangshi Zhang Guolao - into Asgard to kill Norse thunder god Thor, all for their own varied reasons.

In the game Hearts of Iron 4 by Paradox studio, a small easter egg features Väinämöinen as the leader of the territory of Karelia if/when the Soviet Union implodes in a major civil war.

=== Comic books ===
There is a Finnish comic strip called "Väinämöisen paluu" (The Return of Väinämöinen) by Petri Hiltunen, where Väinämöinen returns from thousand-year exile to modern Finland to comment on the modern lifestyle with humor.

In the storyline "Love her to Death" of the web-comic Nukees, Gav, having died, arrives to an afterlife populated by gods. Among them is Väinämöinen, who, among other things, complains that one only gets women by playing the electric kantele.

In the Uncle Scrooge comic "The Quest for Kalevala", drawn by Don Rosa, Väinämöinen helps Scrooge and company to reassemble the Sampo (mythical mill that could produce gold from thin air) and then leaves with it back to Kalevala, but not before giving Scrooge its handle as a souvenir.

In the webcomic "Axis Powers Hetalia", the character of Finland was given the human name Tino Väinämöinen.
