= Kihovauhkonen =

Kihovauhkonen or Vihovauhkonen is a figure in Finnish mythology, typically described as someone who made prophecies about the future and the great war of the end times.

== Description ==
He was first mentioned in 1663, when provost of Paltamo Johan Cajanus wrote that Kihawanskoinen is one of the sons of the giant Kaleva. In 1747, Eric Juvelius wrote that Kihavaiconen was a man who travelled in Lohtaja, Kalajoki and Pyhäjoki, teaching people tar making.

In Savo, it was said that Kiho Vauhkonen performed magic tricks on the market square. He could climb up a wall backwards, eat massive amounts of food in one meal, and dive into the lake without needing to come back to surface. If he bought a horse, he'd pay well over the asked price; however, after a moment the bills he gave turned into empty slips of paper.

In Pyhäjärvi, he was remembered as a highly remarkable man. At the time, there was only one house on the Tikkalanniemi peninsula, but Kihovauhkonen predicted there would one day be so many that it would be no trouble for a squirrel to jump from roof to roof around the whole peninsula, which later became true. He also predicted that an iron horse will travel over the straits, and this will be a sign of the coming of a great war.

In Mikkeli, it was said that Vihovauhkonen lived near Sortavala in a small cottage. He was a hermit who had come from Russia and wore a monk's habit. He told prophecies, predicting the building of Sortavala city and its borders and the building of the church on Kisämäki hill. He said a railway would be built, along which an iron horse would snort, and that people would fly in the air in loud buzzing machines. Finally, there will be a great war where blood will flow so much a log will float in blood in the Läsälampi pond near the church. All of the prophecies had come true except for the one about war.

Some of Kihovauhkonen's prophecies are shared with other future telling figures in Finnish folklore, such as Prättäkitti. Prättäkitti was also said to have predicted flying machines, but said prediction was only written down in the 1930s, after airplanes had already been invented. Similarly, Kihovauhkonen's flying machine prediction was written down in 1937.
