= Anna-Leena Siikala =

Finnish mythologist (1943–2016)

Arja Anna-Leena Siikala (formerly Kuusi, née Aarnisalo, born Helsinki, 1 January 1943, died Espoo, 27 February 2016) was a professor emerita at the University of Helsinki, specialising in folk-belief, mythology, and shamanism, along with oral storytelling and traditionality.

== Education and career ==
Anna-Leena Siikala graduated as a Master of Philosophy from the University of Helsinki in 1968, took her licenciate degree in 1970, and Ph.D. in 1978. She was a professor of folkloristics at Helsinki 1995–2007. Siikala held the following professorships:

- 1995–2007: Helsingin yliopisto, Professor of Folklore.
- 1999–2004: Suomen Akatemia, Academy Professor.
- 1988–1995: Joensuun yliopisto, Professor of Folklore Studies.
- 1979–1982: Turun yliopiston folkloristiikan ja uskontotieteen vs. professori

She undertook fieldwork in Finland and the Cook Islands in Polynesia, and among the Finnic-speaking peoples of Russia, Udmurt people, the Komi peoples, and the Khanty people of Siberia.

Siikala's most important research projects were Myth, history, society: Ethnic/National Traditions in the Age of Globalization (1999–2004) and The Other Russia: Cultural Multiplicity in the Making (2004–2007). Together with Mihály Hoppál and Vladimir Napolskikh she edited the Encyclopaedia of Uralic Mythologies.

In 2009, Siikala was elected to the Akateemikko.

== Publications ==
Anna-Leena Siikala had over 230 publications to her name. Key works are:

- The Rite Technique of the Siberian Shaman (Ph.D. thesis, FF Communications 220, 1978 and 1989).
- Interpreting Oral Narrative (FF Communications 245, 1990).
- Suomalainen šamanismi: Mielikuvien historiaa. Suomalaisen Kirjallisuuden Seuran toimituksia 565 (3rd ed.). Helsinki: Suomalaisen Kirjallisuuden Seura. 1999 [1992]. ISBN 951-717-704-6.
- Studies in Shamanism (Ethnologica Uralica 1992 and 1998, Budapest, with Mihály Hoppálin).
- Mythic Images and Shamanism. A Perspective on Kalevala Poetry (FF Communications 280, 2002).
- Return to Culture. Oral Tradition and Society in the Southern Cook Islands (FF Communications 287, 2005, with Jukka Siikalan).
- Itämerensuomalaisten mytologia. Suomalaisen Kirjallisuuden Seuran toimituksia 1388. Helsinki: Suomalaisen Kirjallisuuden Seura. 2012. ISBN 978-952-222-393-7.
