= Christfried Ganander =

Finnish compiler of folk culture, priest and lexicographer (1741–1790)

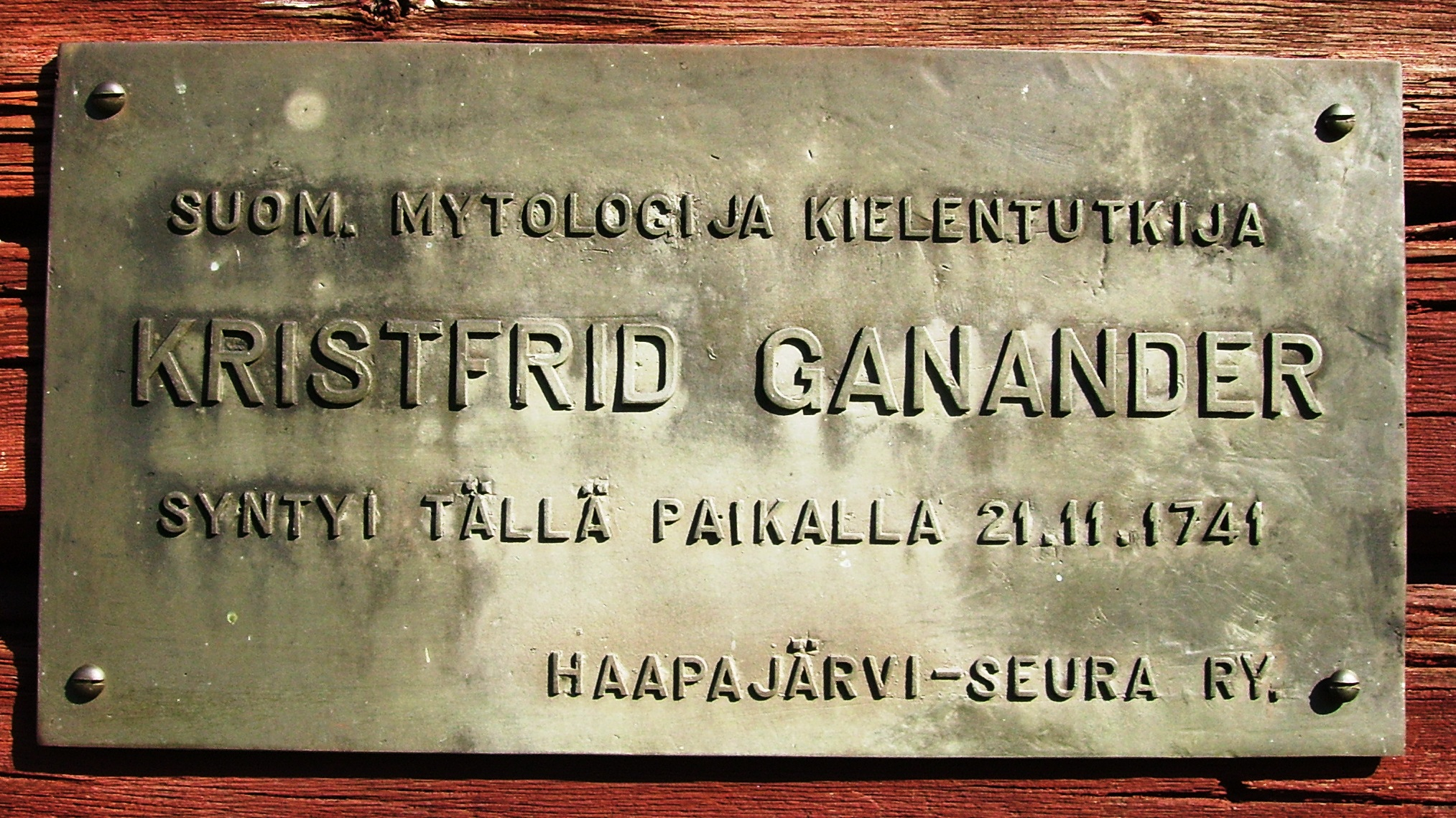
Plaque at Christfried Ganander's place of birth in Haapajärvi

Christfried (Note: Also spelled Christfrid and Kristfrid) Ganander (21 November 1741 in Haapajärvi – 17 February 1790 in Rantsila) was a Finnish compiler of folk culture, a priest and lexicographer. Ganander's greatest achievement was the compilation of the first fully extensive Finnish-language dictionary which was, however, unpublished. He was also a collector of folk culture well before Elias Lönnrot. His most well-known published work is Mythologia Fennica in 1789, a reference book of folk religion. He also published some poetry and worked as a teacher.

== Life ==
Ganander was born in Haapajärvi in 1741, to chaplain Thomas Ganader and his wife Helena Hiden. After his father's death in 1752, he was taken in by his grandfather Henrik Hiden, who was also a chaplain in the vicarage of Kauhajoki. Christfried himself later worked as a chaplain in Rantsila from 1775 to 1790.

He became a priest at the Academy of Turku and was consecrated to a post in 1763. He completed his master's degree in 1766. While studying, he became influenced by the natural sciences and became interested in the notion of Finnishness of Henrik Gabriel Porthan.

== Works ==
Aenigmata Fennica

Ganander began his literary career by publishing a collection of riddles and fairy tales, which he collected from oral tradition in Ostrobothnia while chaplain in Rantsila. His collection Aenigmata Fennica, Suomalaiset Arwotuxet Wastausten kansa was published in 1783 and comprises in its first edition, 378 riddles (though a later edition was shortened to remove some sexual and ecclesiastical riddles). It is based on the folk poetry he had collected as well as the Finnish lexicon.

Mythologia Fennica

In 1789, Mythologia Fennica was published as a reference book of folk poetry, spells, traditions, and literary sources. The book was also a presentation of the early history of the Finnish people. The work was originally completed in 1785, and was in fact a subset of Ganander's wider lexicographical work. A reprinted version was printed in 1961. Elias Lönnrot considered it to be a notable work. Lönnrot later continued from Ganader's starting point.

Nytt Finskt Lexicon

The most notable of Ganader's works is his dictionary Nytt Finskt Lexicon. The dictionary includes over 30,000 lexical entries which have Swedish and Latin explanations. There are also etymological explanations in his book. Although it was not published during his lifetime, it was finally published as a reprint between 1937 and 1940.

Other works

In 1780, Ganander published a thesis about the origin, way of life and language of the Romany. His national and scholarly interests applied to education in the late 18th century. Ganader published two of the first Finnish-language medical books Maan-Miehen Huone- ja Koti-Aptheeki ("The Home Pharmacy for the Country Man") and Eläinten Tauti-Kirja ("A Book of Animal Diseases"). There were many editions of these works still being used in the 19th century.
