= Välko Tuul =

Estonian artist

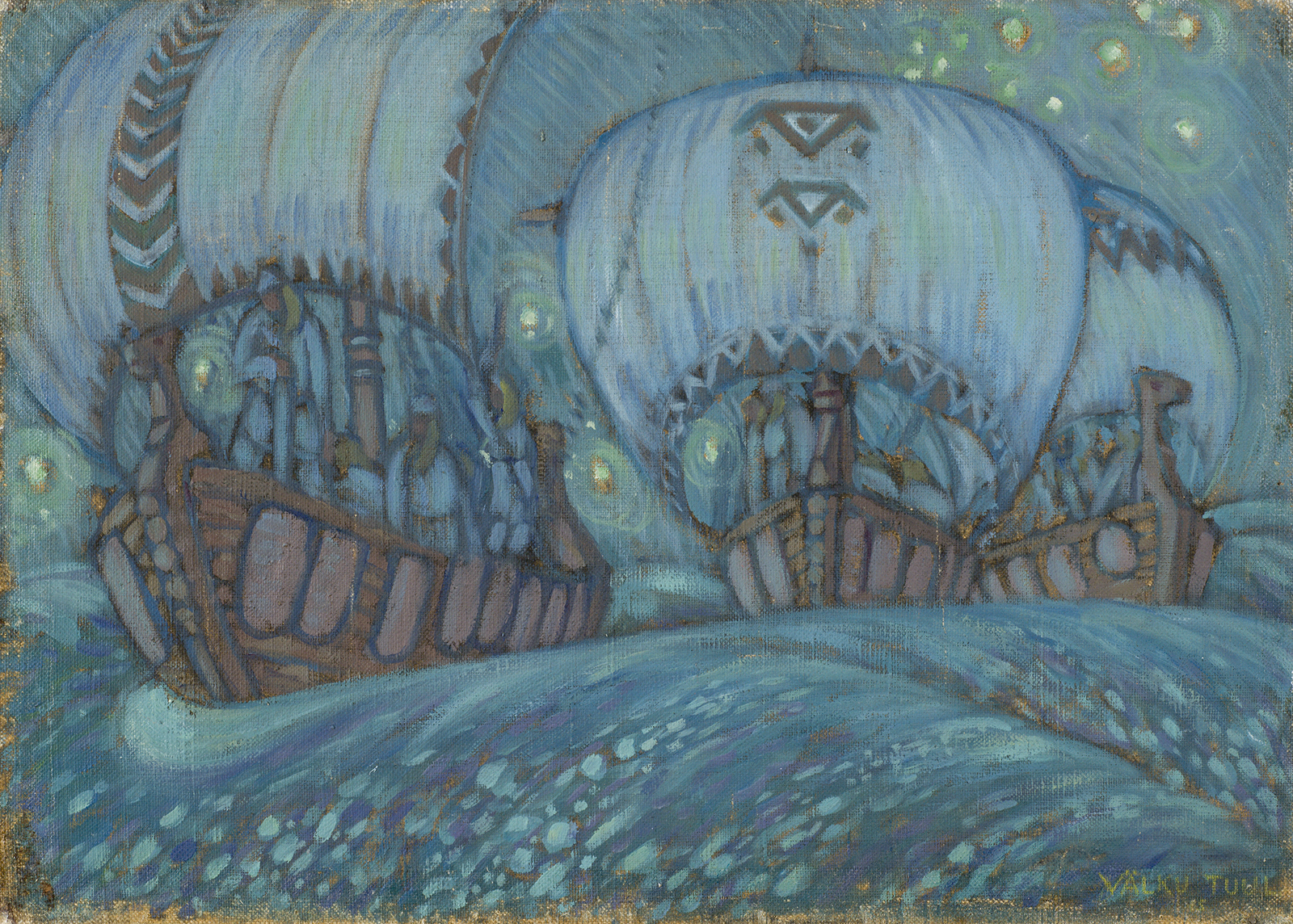
Välko Tuul, Viikingite laevad (Viking ships), 1915

Välko Tuul (born Alfred-Oscar Tuul, 13 October 1894, Tallinn – 17 March 1918, Tallinn) was an Estonian painter.

== Biography ==
Välko Tuul was born in the present-day capital of Estonia, Tallinn, and started studying art in his free time. In 1913 he joined the art school of Ants Laikmaa, encouraged by his friend Oskar Kallis. His works were exhibited for the first time in 1915. In 1917 he joined the artist's group Vikerla together with Oskar Kallis, Aleksander Mülber, Balder Tomasberg and Roman Haavamägi. He died of pneumonia in 1918, aged only 23.

== Art ==
The paintings by Tuul are often characterised by an oneiric quality, underlined by his frequent use of blue shades. Stylistically, he can be counted among the Estonian Symbolists and several of his paintings are on themes from the Estonian national epic Kalevipoeg.
