= Aleksander Mülber =

Estonian artist

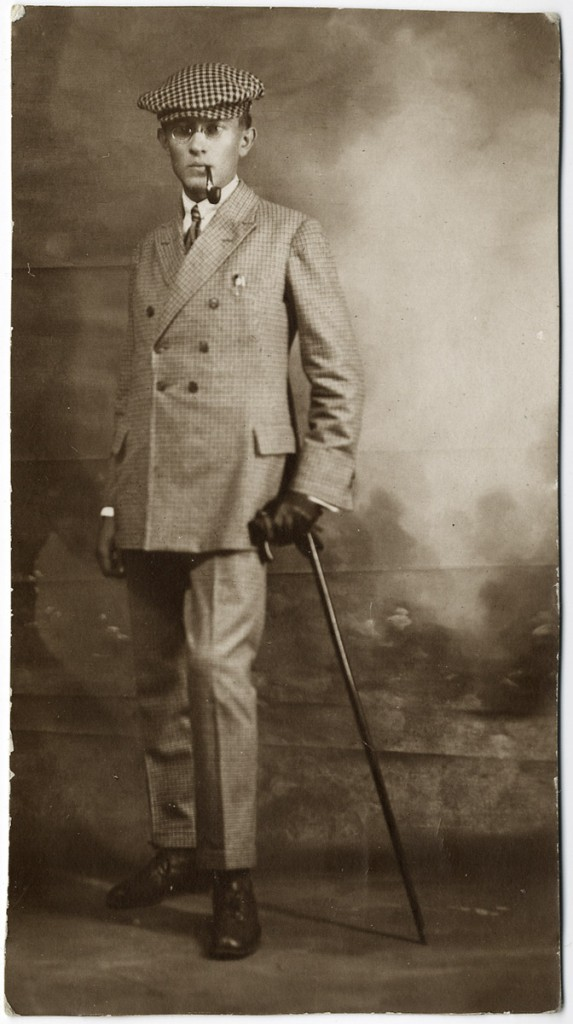
Aleksander Mülber in 1921

Aleksander Mülber (29 December 1897, Tallinn – 19 May 1931, Paris) was an Estonian painter and printmaker.

== Biography ==
Aleksander Mülber began studying art in 1912, switching from a school of commerce where he had originally enrolled. He studied under Ants Laikmaa and at the Estonian Art Society. He participated in an exhibition of young artists in 1915, where his pastels in a National Romantic style were appreciated by the critics. Together with his artist colleagues and friends Oskar Kallis and Välko Tuul, he joined the artists' colong Vikerla on the Pakri islands, founded by Balder Tomasberg. He remained part of the group until 1918. At the end of this period his art took on a darker note, probably as a reaction to the death of his two friends Kallis and Tuul. During the Estonian War of Independence he was together with six other artists sent to the front in order to rescue and preserve art and other objects of cultural heritage significance threatened with destruction by the fighting. Following the war, he moved to Paris in 1921 and spent the last years of his life there.

== Paintings ==
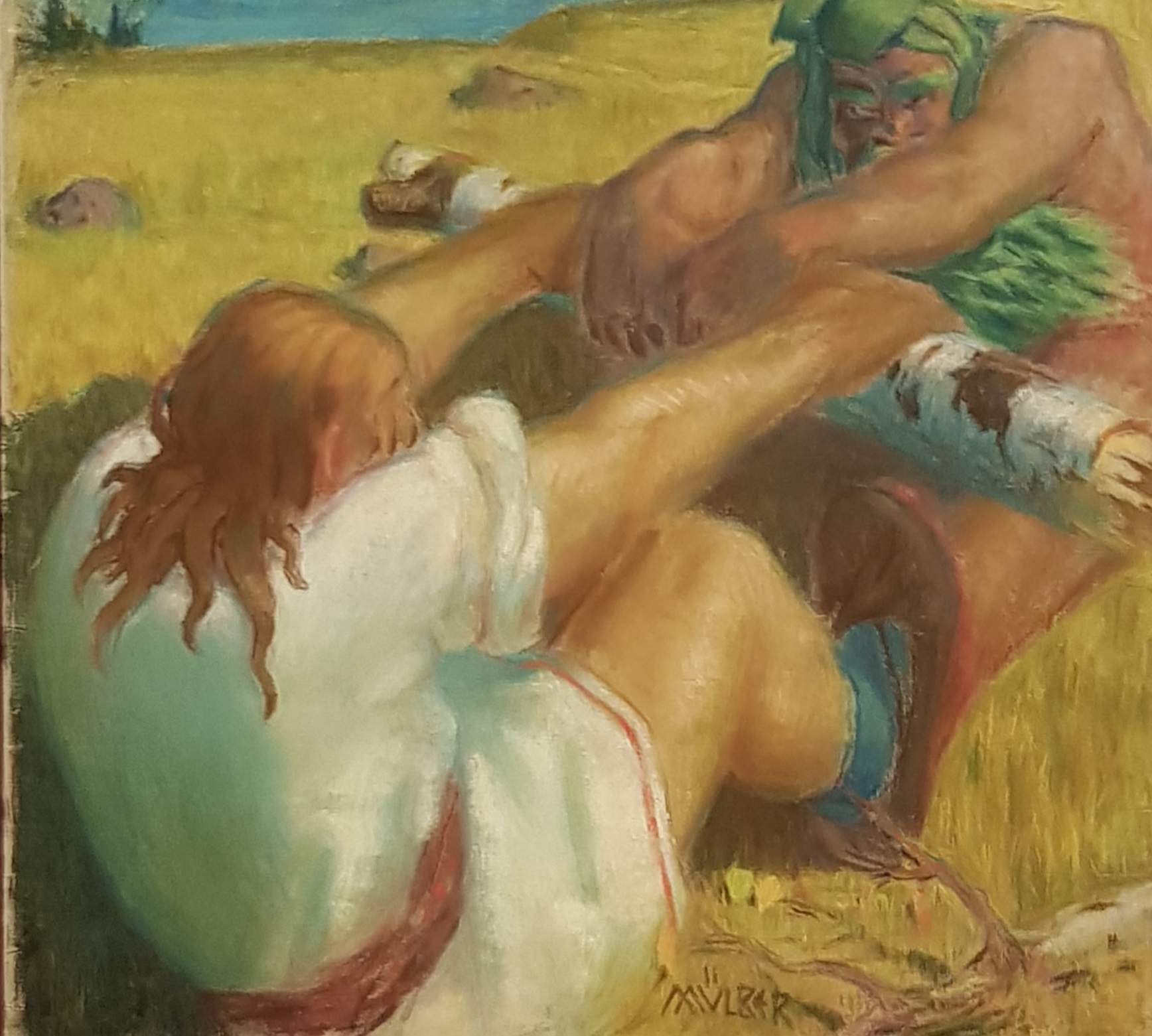
Kalevipoeg and Sorts fighting (1915)

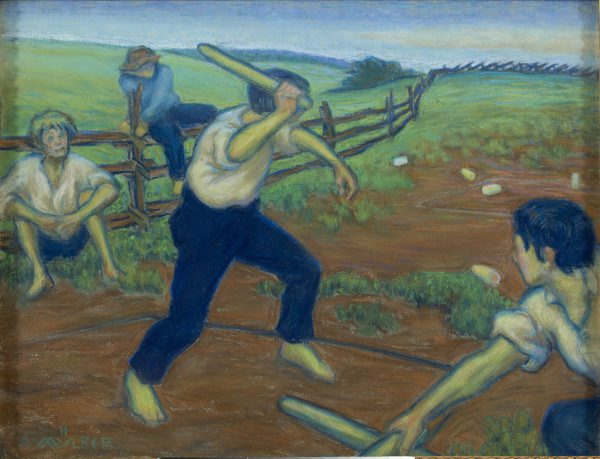
Strainer throwers (1915)

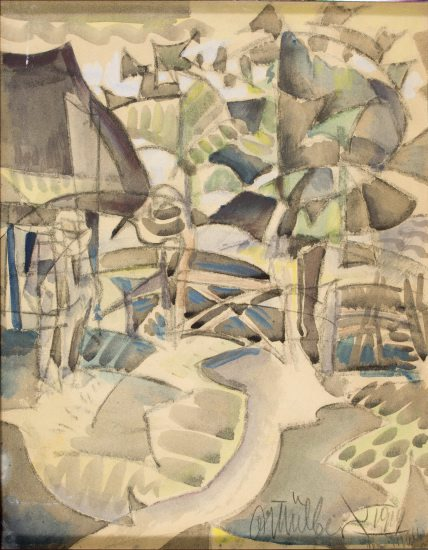
Composition (1919)

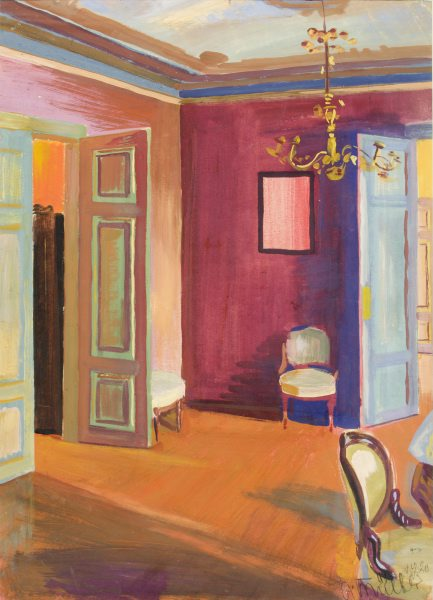
Interior (1920)

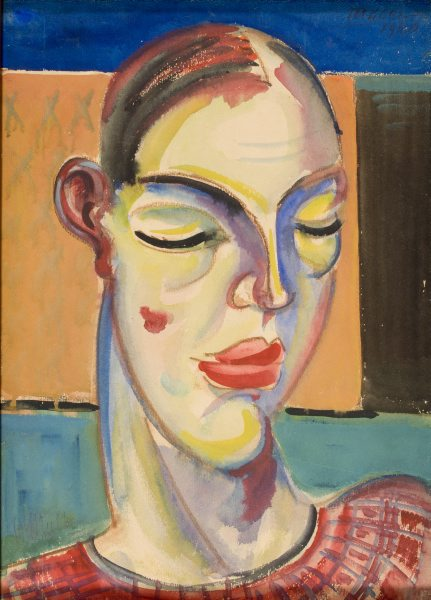
Pea (1920)

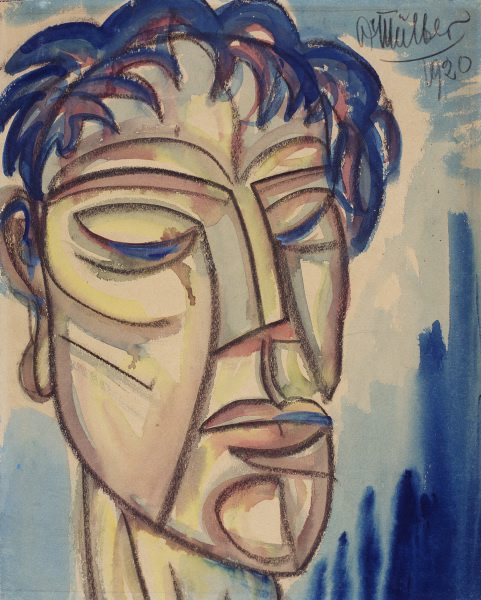
Pea (1920)
