= Estonian art =

Estonian art is art that comes from Estonia, from Estonian artists or art pieces relating to Estonia. Starting from prehistoric art, there are no caves with paintings in Estonia. About 1700 registered cup stones have been found from the Bronze Age and archaeological finds from the Neolithic period. Nearest two caves with Paleolithic paintings are in Southern Ural Mountains in Bashkortostan and Russia. In Finland have founded over 100 rock paintings sites in vertical walls of granite rocks... but no caves. Neolithic rock carvings have been preserved in granite rocks on the Eastern coast of Lake Onega, also in the White Sea region, on Kola peninsula, Northern Norway and Southern Sweden etc..

== History ==
=== Prehistoric art ===
Cave paintings were the first pieces of art, they were found in caves and tunnels. Ancestral farmers and gatherers would use blood, bone marrow and crushed up animal hair to add pigmentation to the illustrations. For example, they used blood to make prey look different from the hunters. Eventually they started incorporating wood into their tools and started making more accurate illustrations and paintings by making brushes from wood and animal hair.

=== Gothic art ===
Gothic art in Estonia was mostly found in churches and cathedrals, these churches and cathedrals had paintings and sculptures of religious figures in them. Most of them had Christian symbolism in paintings (most of which were over 8 feet tall); these painting would show Jesus and his disciples in a very artistic and symmetrical way. The Gothic Age in Estonia started around 1200 and ended around 1600, the art paintings from the start of this era were paintings about gods and their disciples (mostly portraying Jesus). The Church of the Holy Spirit, one of more famous churches found in Estonia, has a Gothic interior and exterior. The art on the sides of the loft (above the pews) is about Jesus and his journey to enlighten people. The paintings do not have a known artist but it is known that the artist painted them in the first half of the 1300s.

=== Medieval ===
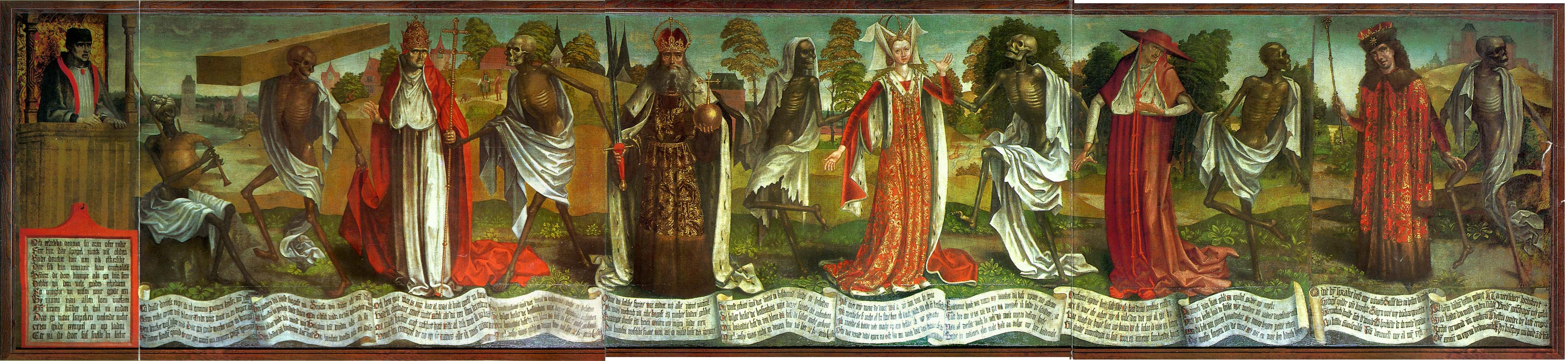
Danse Macabre (from 15th century) by Bernt Notke

Most of the Estonian art in the medieval period (mid-1500s to the 1700s) was inspired by Swedish art. The medieval art style would show the concepts of death and battle. Most pieces of art from this era would be flat and would not resemble reality. The art pieces would have skeletons and walking corpses, these would symbolize the death of people from the wars they had with the Swedish forces.

=== 1918-1940 ===
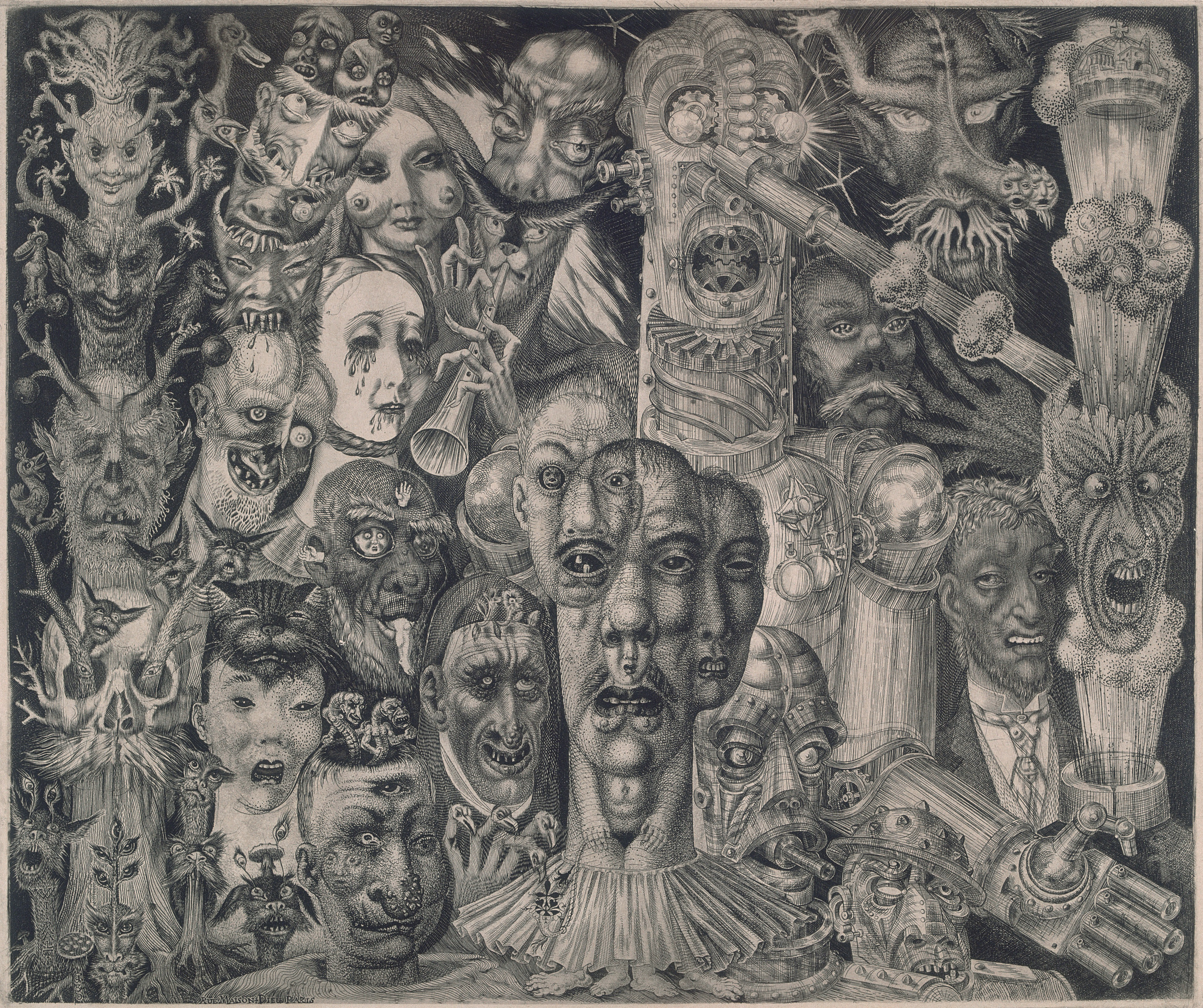
Hell (1930−32) by Eduard Wiiralt

1917-1918 existed organization called Noorte Kujurite Ühing "Vikerla" ('Young Sculptors Union "Vikerla"'). Members were Oskar Kallis, Balder Tomasberg, Välko Tuul, Aleksander Mülber, Aleksander Krims-Radava ja Roman Haavamägi and Paul Liivak. This organization was so short-lived because some members died during Estonian War of Independence.

=== Soviet era ===
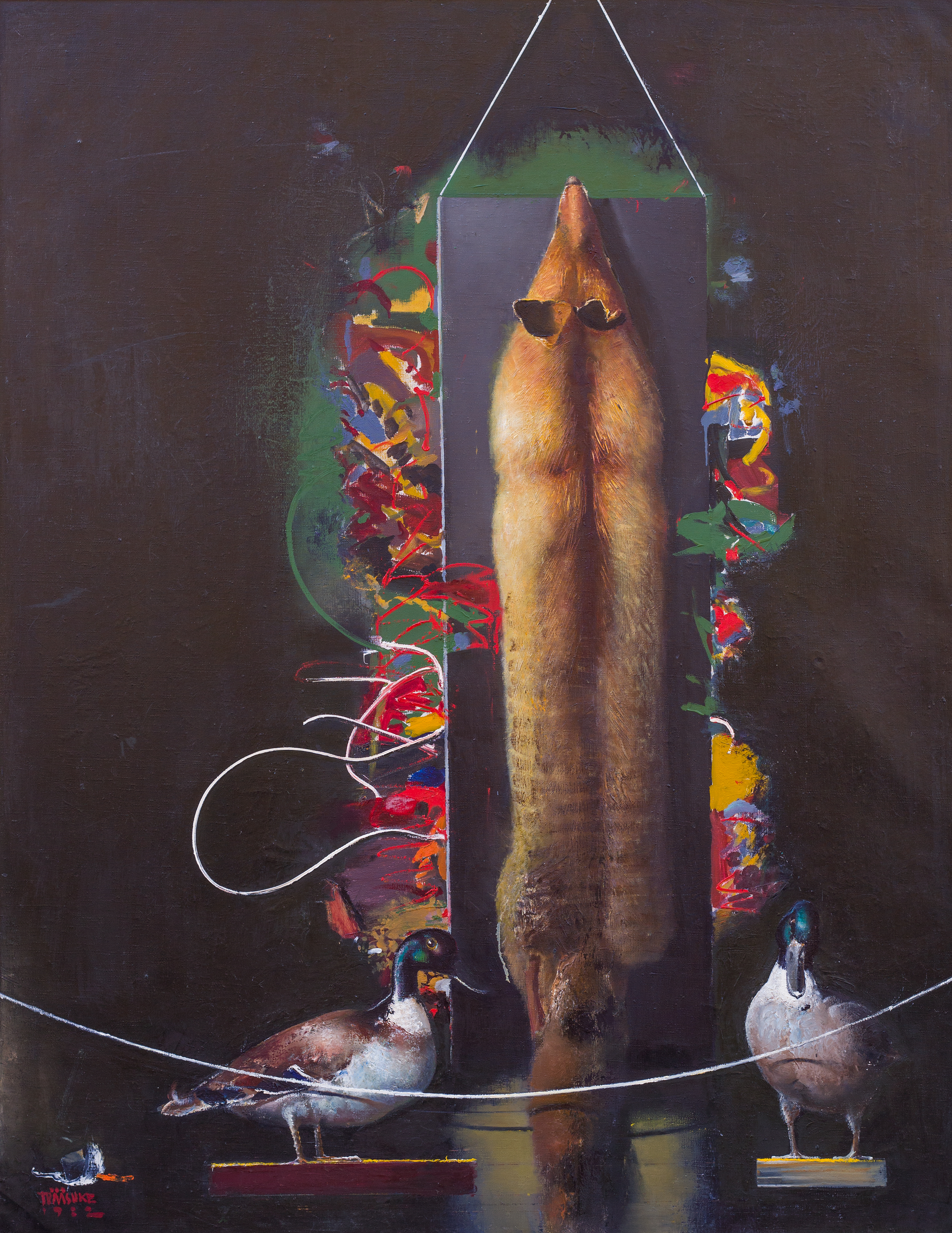
Exposition (1982). Tiit Pääsuke

During the Soviet rule (from 1940 to 1991), the art movement of socialist realism emerged. Socialist realism would show the struggles of the people that were affected by Soviet rule; it would show the struggles of the middle to lower class households in workplace scenarios or as a family in a home. This period of art was not as popular when compared to other art periods.

=== The Great World Wars ===
The most notable work is the Bronze Soldier (made by Enn Roos and Supervising architect Arnold Alas) it was unveiled on the 22 September 1947 on the second anniversary of the Soviet Red Army re-entering Tallinn in September 1944. It was originally a war memorial for the people lost in the Second World War, and was moved between several war graves, but subsequently was put at the Tallinn military cemetery where it still resides.

=== Post independence era ===
Estonia started surreal art from early 1900 and is quite renowned in comparison to other countries in the region. This era of art is one of the hardest to plot in skill due to the vast variety each art piece conveys but this then led to the next art style. Modernism started in the early 1900s but did not become famous until around the 1950s in Estonia. Estonia is well known for its modernist paintings and illustrations. Most of the post-independence art is modern and talks about the struggles of the past; some depict the most notable moment in Estonian art, the day of their fight for independence. After modern art, Estonia is going through the phase of contemporary art style as of this moment. Contemporary art is a style of art of the 20th and 21st centuries, it is an art style that does not have boundaries like other styles.

== Estonian artist groups and collectives ==
- ANK '64
- Dekoor
- ['mobil] galerii
- Estonian Artists Association
- Non Grata #was active in 2000s in Pärnu
- Pallas (society)
- 1960 Art Group

Established about 1956–1957 in Tartu, and dissolved about 1960. The group not accepted in that time dominating socialist realism.

- Para '89

Established in 1989 in Tartu by Jüri Palm ja Ilmar Malin. Active until 1993. They called themselves "neo-surrealists".

- SOUP ’69 #was active in Tallinn
- Stuudio 22 #established in 1972 by Tõnis Vint
- Uus Kunstnikkude Koondis #active in 1930-1940
- Vikerla
- Visarid
