= Linda (Kalevipoeg) =

Literary character from Estonian mythology

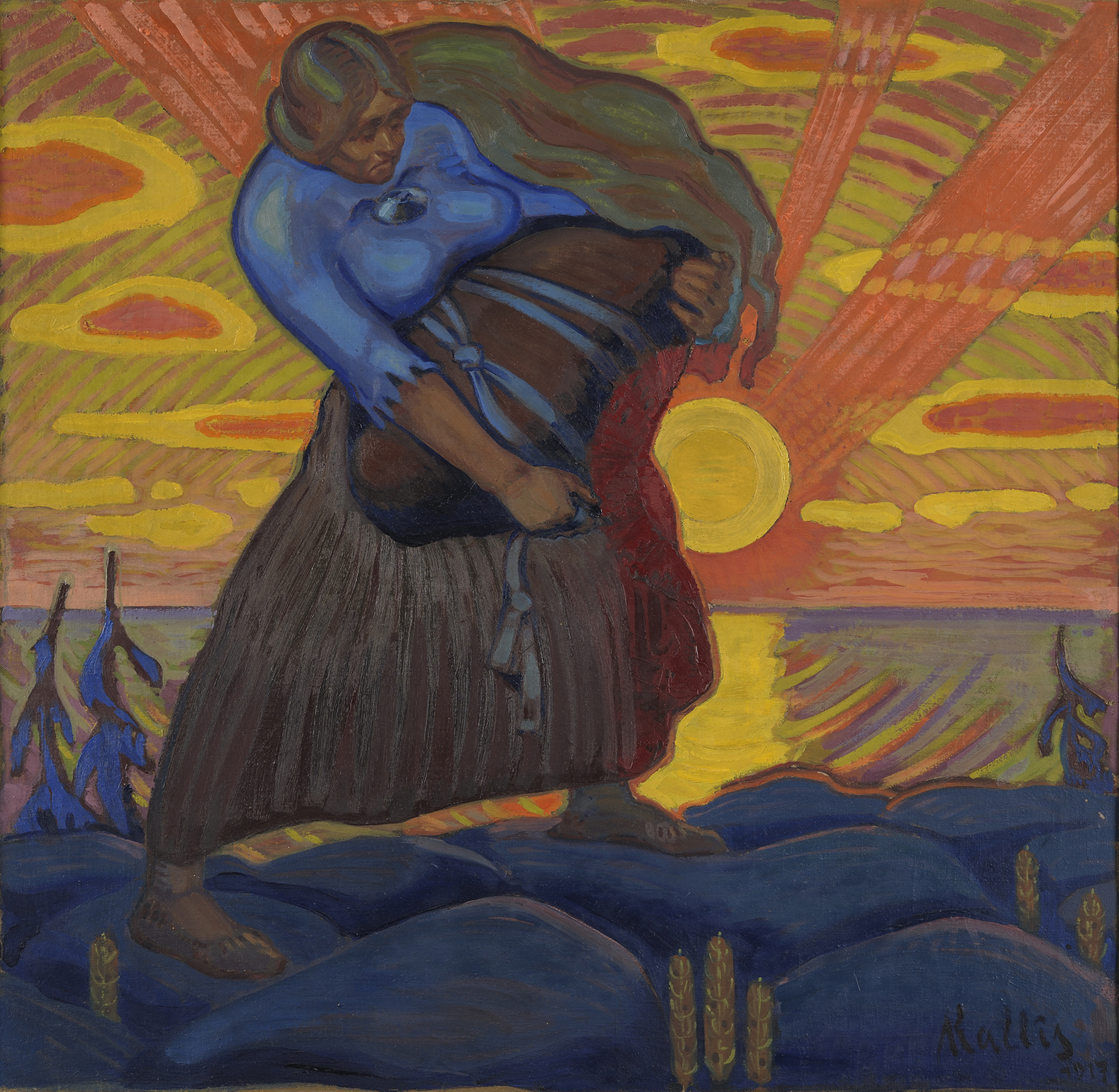
"Linda Carrying a Rock" by Oskar Kallis. 1917

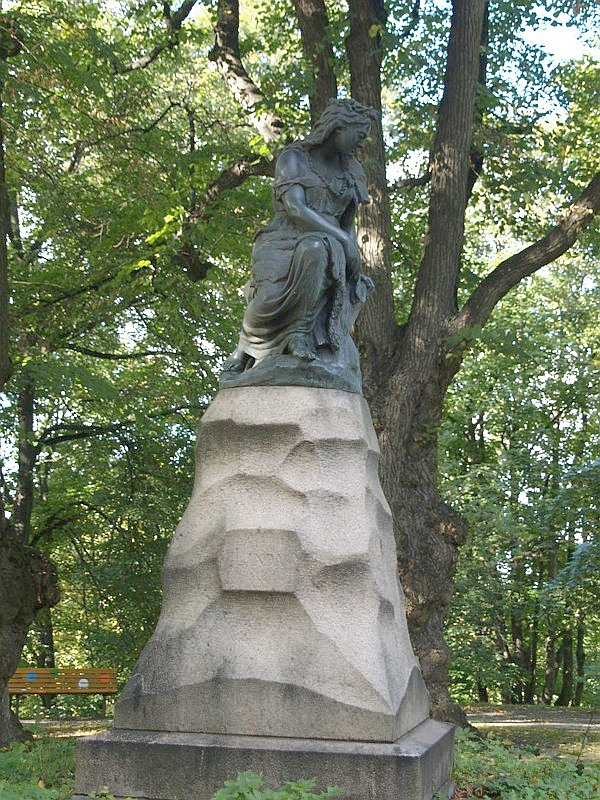
Linda sculpture, Lindamägi, Tallinn

In the Estonian mythology and Kreutzwald's epic Kalevipoeg, Linda was the mother of Kalevipoeg and the wife of Kalev.

She has given the name to several Estonian locations, including the Lindamägi (Linda Hill), Tallinn, Lindakivi (Linda boulder) in Lake Ülemiste. According to the epic myth "Kalevipoeg", her son, the title character, named the Estonian fortress settlement at the location of modern Tallinn in her honor - Lindanise (approximate translation: Linda's nipple or bosom).

== See also ==
- Legends of Tallinn
