= Linda (sculpture) =

Sculpture by August Weizenberg

Coordinates: 59°26′04″N 24°44′13″E

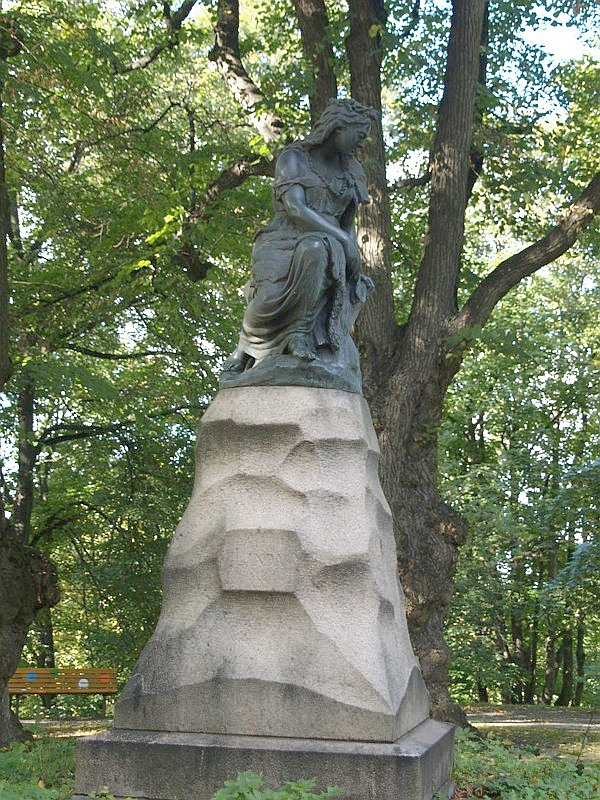
- August Weizenberg's Linda monument
- Artist: August Weizenberg
- Year: 1920; 105 years ago
- Medium: Bronze, granite
- Dimensions: 121 cm × 54.5 cm × 63 cm (48 in × 21.5 in × 25 in)

Linda is a monument created by the sculptor August Weizenberg. It was completed in 1920, and it stands on Linda Hill (Estonian: Lindamägi) in Tallinn, Estonia. It is registered as cultural heritage.

== Description ==
The bronze figural part of the monument depicts a well-known episode from the Estonian national epic Kalevipoeg, in which the grieving Linda, carrying a stone to Kalev's grave, has sat down to rest on the stone. The sculpture stands on a faceted granite plinth reminiscent of a tall cliff.

The Linda monument has become a national symbol and a place where victims of deportation are commemorated in Tallinn. In front of it is a granite plaque with the words of the poet Marie Under: Ikka mõtlen neile, kes siit viidi ... Taeva poole karjub nende äng (I still think of those that were taken from here ... Their anguish screams to the sky).

== History ==
Weizenberg was interested in Estonian mythology, and he wanted to erect a statue of Vanemuine on Toome Hill in Tartu and a statue of Linda, the mother of Kalevipoeg, in Tallinn. The first version of Linda, carved in marble, was completed in 1880, and it is now located in the Art Museum of Estonia. In 1920, the sculptor's wish was realized: a statue of Linda, cast in bronze at the A. Strauss Foundry in Tallinn, was erected on the mythical tumulus of Kalev at the foot of Toompea Hill on the Swedish Bastion. A granite boulder was brought from Finland to serve as the plinth of the statue, and it was installed on May 27, 1920.

Linda Park (Lindamäe park) and Linda Hill (Lindamägi) are also named after the monument. A 1920 article in the newspaper Päevaleht commented: "We have many hills; namely Harju Gate Hill (Harjuvärava mägi), Beach Gate Hill (Rannavärava mägi), and Viru Gate Hill (Viruvärava mägi). The name Swedish Bastion (Rootsi kants) does not really say anything, and that is why it would be worth calling this green hill Linda Hill from now on."

== Commemoration of the victims of deportation ==
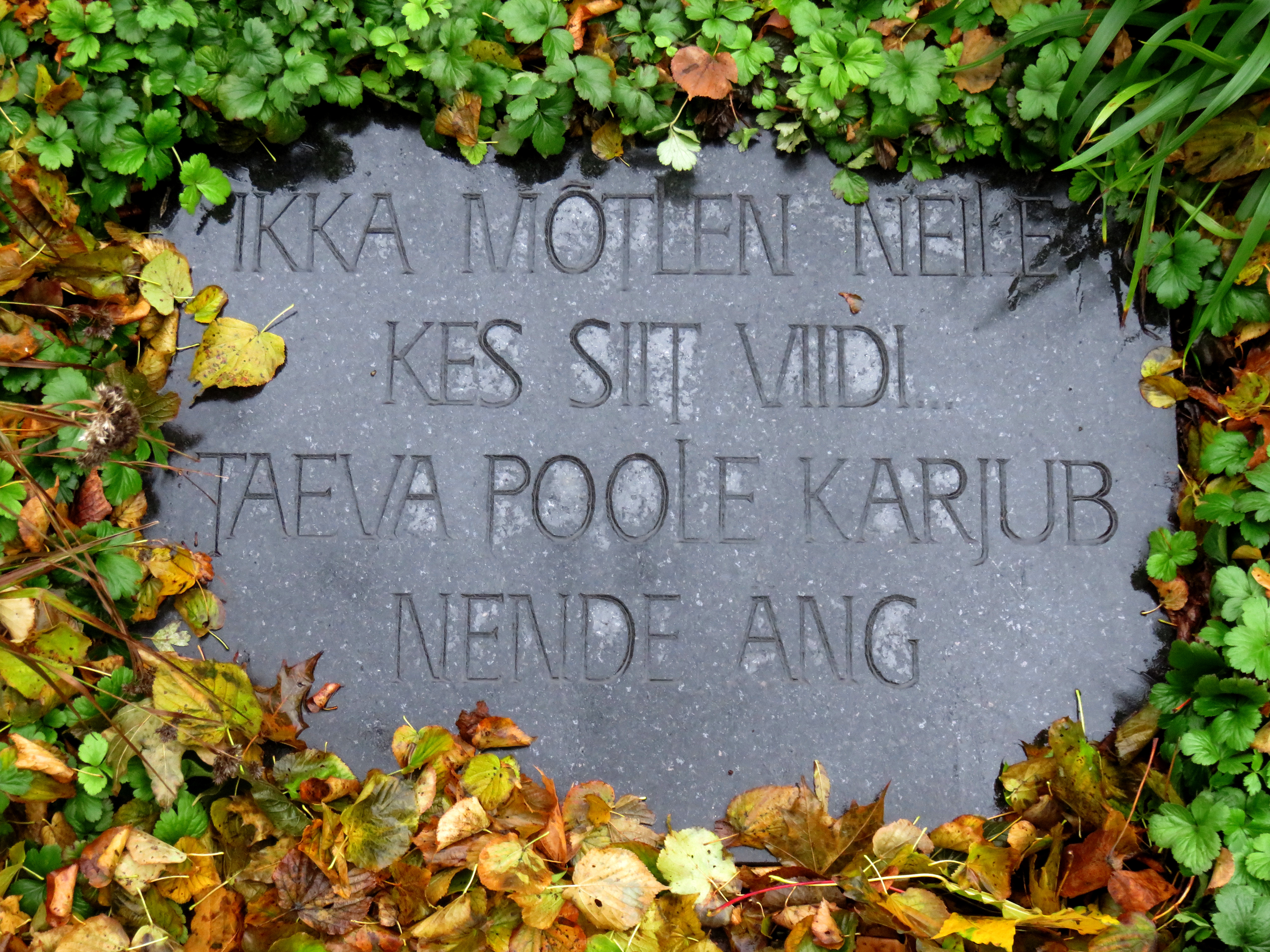
Plaque commemorating the victims of deportation with a verse by Marie Under

Twice a year, on the anniversary of the March deportation of 1949 on March 25 and on the anniversary of the June deportation of 1941 on June 14, the victims of the deportations are commemorated in a ceremony held by the Estonian Memento Union (Estonian: Eesti Memento Liit) at the Linda monument. At the ceremony, speeches are made and wreaths are placed at the foot of the Linda monument, and candles are lit by representatives of the Parliament (Riigikogu), the Government of Estonia, the Estonian Defense Forces and the Estonian Defense League, the Tallinn City Government, the diplomatic corps, and civic organizations. The memorial ceremony starts at 4 pm, and at the same time church bells are rung across Estonia.

The June deportation of 1941 was commemorated for the first time at the Linda monument on June 14, 1942.
