= Legends of Tallinn =

Folklore about the capital city of Estonia

Like any other medieval city, Tallinn (known as Reval from the 13th century until the 1920s) has inspired many legends.

== Legend of Lake Ülemiste ==
In the Lake Ülemiste, the largest lake surrounding Tallinn, there is boulder called Lindakivi ("Linda's rock"). In Estonian mythology, it is believed to be one of the boulders Linda was supposed to carry to Kalev's grave at Toompea, but which fell off her apron. She sat on the boulder and cried, thus creating the lake.

The semi-legendary-mythological "Ülemiste Elder" (Estonian: Ülemiste vanake) is believed to live in the lake. If anyone should meet him, then he is believed to ask: "Is Tallinn ready yet?". If then the other person answered "yes", then he would flood the city. Thus, the correct answer would be: "No, there is much to be done yet". This tale is sometimes viewed as an explanation why Tallinn is building/growing all the time.

== The legend of Oleviste Church ==
A long time ago Tallinn was growing pretty slowly. All the inhabitants wanted Tallinn to be a big seaport, but the merchant ships would not come to Tallinn. Then someone got a very interesting idea: to build a church with such a high tower that nobody had ever seen before. The ships would see the church from the open sea and would come to Tallinn with their goods. Everybody liked the idea. But where would they find such a craftsman to build such a church? Suddenly out of nowhere came a craftsman who applied for the job. Citizens gladly accepted him, but he asked a very high price for his job - ten barrels of gold with one strange condition: if someone would find out his name, then he would work for free. Of course, the citizens agreed. The craftsman started working very fast and the people in Tallinn were getting dimmer and dimmer. Every evening they would come to him and say different names hoping that that would be his name. The church was almost finished. The citizens of Tallinn were getting more and more scared. Then they sent a spy to his wife, and he overheard how she was singing to her baby: Sleep my baby, tomorrow our Olev is coming back and will bring us ten barrels of gold! The spy rushed back into the city. The craftsman was on the roof of the church, placing the cross. When the people started calling him: Hey, Olev! Make sure the cross is straight! When Olev heard his name he understood that he wouldn't get gold! He let the cross go and fell to the ground. At the same moment his body turned into stone. This legend is reenacted at Tallinn Legends, Tallinn's museum of history and folklore.
