= Balder Tomasberg =

Estonian artist

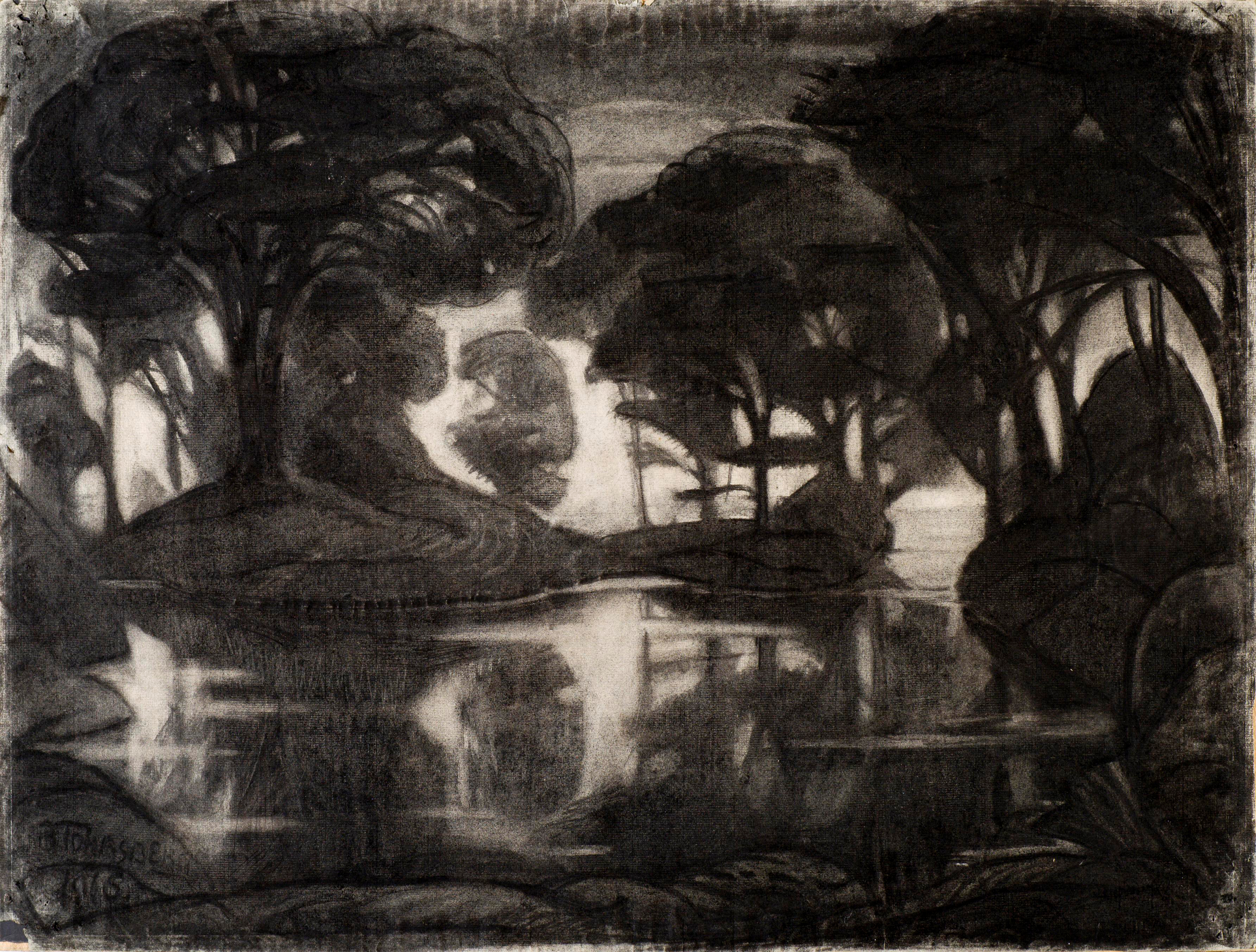
"Heroic Landscape", charcoal drawing by Balder Tomasberg, 1918

Balder Tomasberg (1897, Paldiski – 1919, near Saint Petersburg) was an Estonian artist.

== Biography ==
Tomasberg was born in Paldiski and moved to Tallinn in 1913. He initially worked as a draughtsman at a construction company and studied art in evening classes given by the Estonian Art Society, with Nikolai Triik as his teacher. In 1915, he ended his art studies, and in early 1916 participated in an exhibition arranged by the Estonian Art Society. He was subsequently drafted into the Imperial Russian Army and sent to Novgorod to work as a decorator of stage sets for soldier theatres. He returned to Estonia in 1917 and together with his friend, sculptor Roman Haavamägi, a circle of artists called Vikerla, which gathered several students of Ants Laikmaa, including Aleksander Mülber and Välko Tuul. The works of the group were exhibited together in the autumn of 1918, and Tomasberg contributed with several works with themes from the island of Pakri Islands, where the group had lived as an art colony. Later that year he volunteered to fight in the Estonian War of Independence and was mortally wounded in the fighting three months later.

His work consists of paintings made in pastels and watercolour, as well as graphic arts. The subject matter consists mostly of dream-like or fantastic landscapes.
