= Jakob Liiv =

Estonian poet, playwright, and schoolteacher

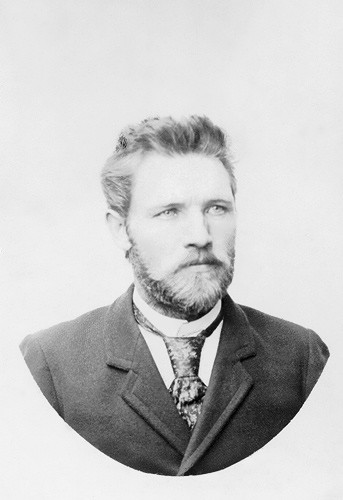
Jakob Liiv c. 1890

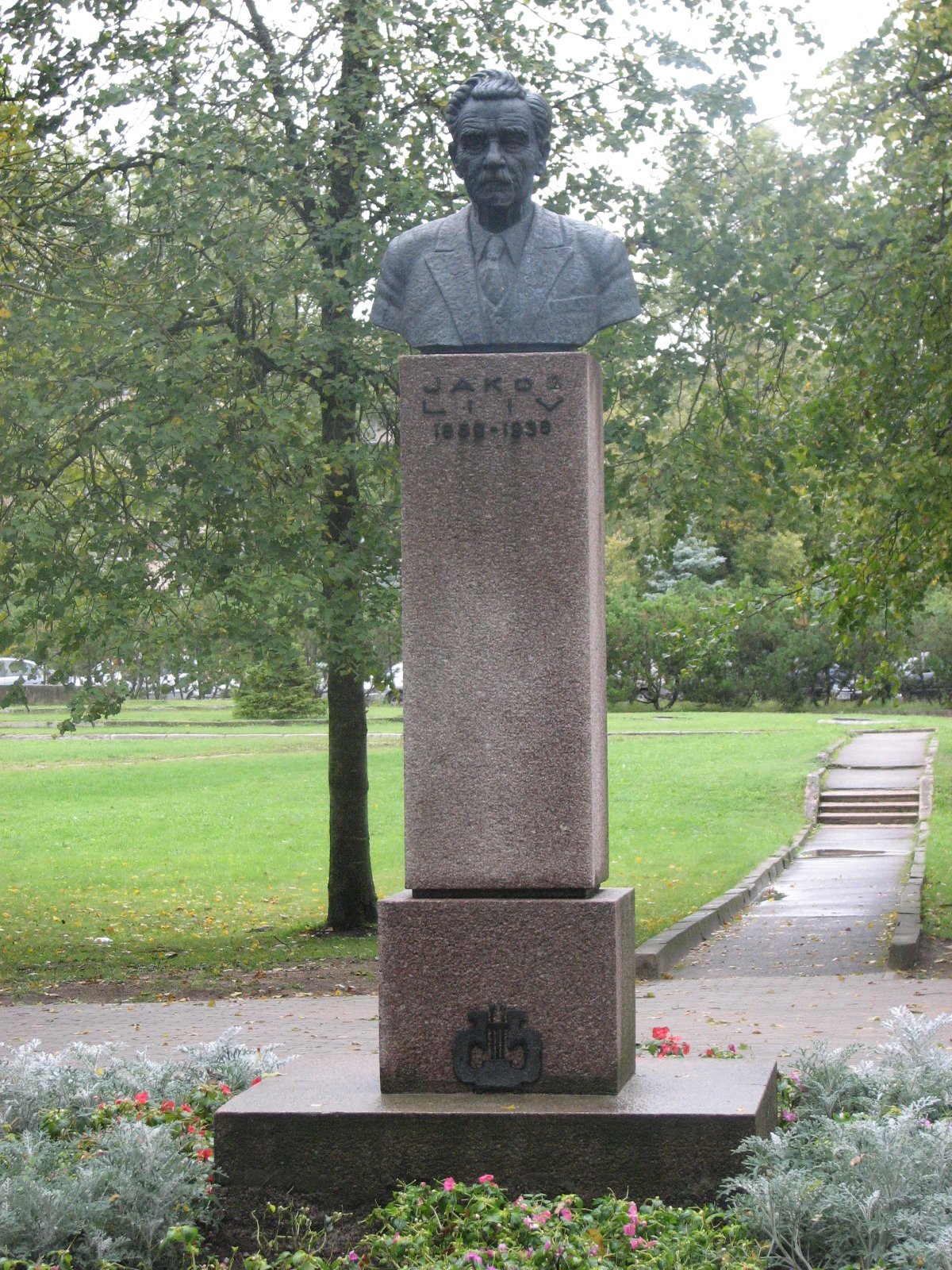
Monument to Jakob Liiv in Väike-Maarja, created by Roman Haavamägi

Jakob Liiv (28 February 1859 Alatskivi Parish, Tartu County – 17 January 1938 Rakvere) was an Estonian writer and playwright.

His younger brother was the writer Juhan Liiv.

After 1897 he was a teacher at Triigi-Avispea School in Väike-Maarja Parish. Because he was a notable public figure, writers gathered around him (earning him the nickname the Parnassus of Väike-Maarja). In 1913 he moved to Rakvere, where he worked as a bank clerk and at the same time as an editor for the local newspaper.

From 1919 to 1921 he was the mayor of Rakvere.

He was a member of the Estonian Labour Party.

== Selected works ==
- 1886: Viru kannel (The Viru Lyre), poetry collection
- 1898: Kõrbelõvi (The Desert Lion), poetry collection
- 1904: Kolmat aega vallavanem (The Third-Term Parish Elder), play
- 1938: Mälestusi lühijuttudes (Memories in Short Stories), collection of short stories
