= Lindamägi =

Park in Tallinn, Estonia

Coordinates: 59°26′03″N 24°44′12″E

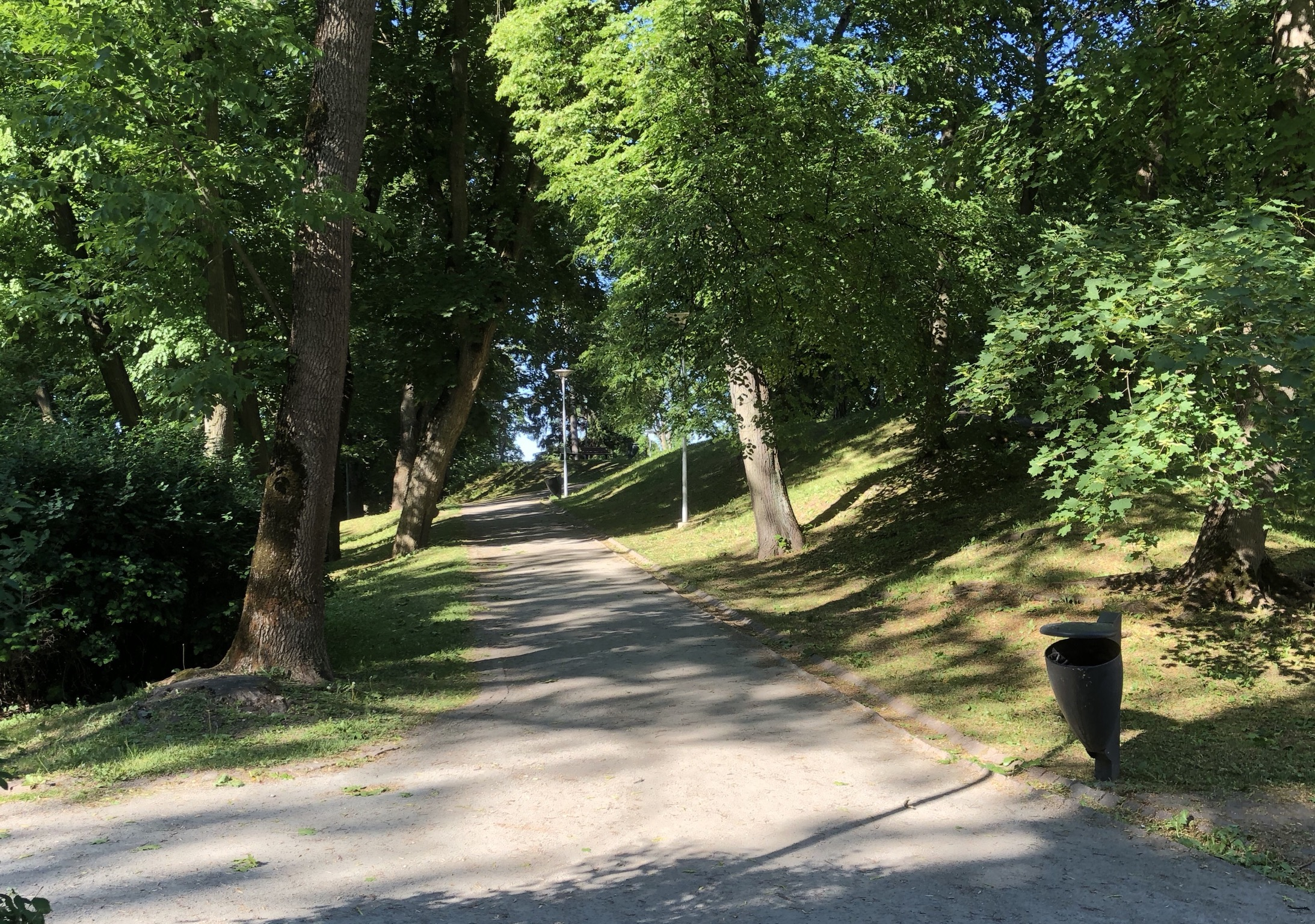
Lindamägi (June 2018)

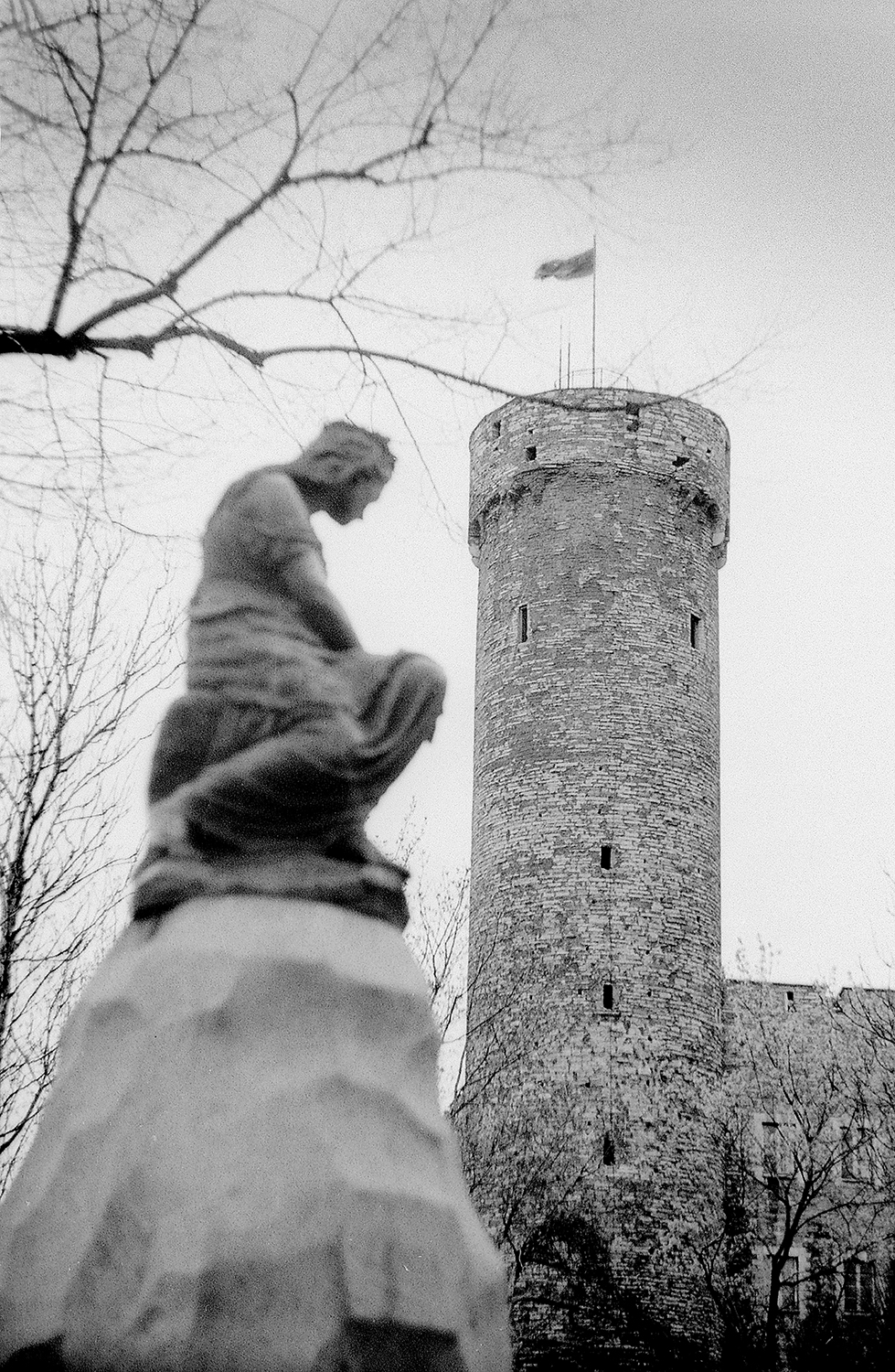
Sculpture "Linda" (1971)

Lindamägi is a park in Tallinn, Estonia.

The park is located on the Swedish Bastion. Swedish Bastion was built in 1690s. In 1850s, the Swedish Bastion was changed to the park.

In 1920, the bronze sculpture Linda was erected in the park. The sculpture was made by August Weizenberg. The park is named after this sculpture.
