= Juhan Liiv =

Estonian writer

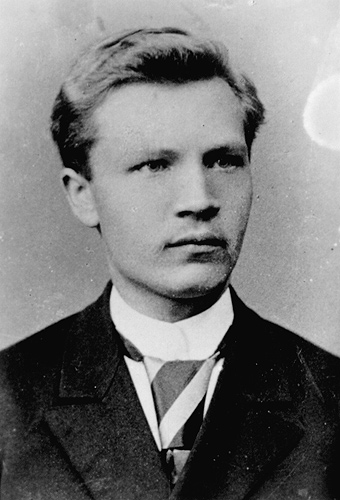
- Liiv as a young man
- Born: Johannes Liiv; 30 April 1864; Allatzkiwwi, Kreis Dorpat, Governorate of Livonia, Russian Empire
- Died: 1 December 1913 (aged 49); Werbach-Kosse, Governorate of Livonia, Russian Empire
- Resting place: Alatskivi cemetery, Tartu county
- Occupations: Prose writer, poet
- Parent(s): Benjamin Liiv, Marianna Liiv
- Relatives: Jakob Liiv (brother); Kaarel Liiv (brother); Elias Liiv (brother); Joosep Liiv (brother)
- Writing career
- Language: Estonian
- Notable work: Vari (1894)

Juhan Liiv (30 April [O.S. 18 April] 1864 – 1 December [O.S. 18 November] 1913) was an Estonian poet who is regarded as one of Estonia's most famous poets and prose writers.

== Childhood ==
Juhan (birth name Johannes) Liiv, the son of Benjamin and Marianna Liiv (née Pärn), was born on 30 April 1864, in Alatskivi Parish (now Peipsiääre Parish), in the Kreis Dorpat of the Governorate of Livonia. He grew up in Rupsi village, on Oja farm owned by his family.

Liiv grew up in a poor and devoutly religious family and was second youngest of eight children; three of whom died in infancy, including his only two sisters Liisa and Miina. His older brother Jakob also became a poet. At home, he and his siblings were raised to be staunch Christians and his parents were quick to reprimand any small transgression. Despite their poverty and religion, Liiv's parents understood the importance of education and invested what little money they had towards their children's schooling. He first studied at Naelavere Village School, then at Kodavere Parish School. After going through both schools his parents then sent him to Dorpat (present-day Tartu) to study at the Hugo Treffner Gymnasium, in 1886, but he was unable to adjust to the school and left after six months.

Liiv spent most of his childhood alone, isolated from other children his age, due in part, to chronic childhood illnesses. Illness forced Liiv to leave school and return home, where he wrote poetry and occasional columns for the Olevik newspaper. His poetry starkly contrasted that of his contemporaries, and was therefore largely ignored.

== Short stories ==
The Collected Works of Juhan Liiv. Volume I. Published in 1921, with a foreword by Friedebert Tuglas

Liiv finally achieved success in 1894 when his first short story, Vari (The Shadow), was published. It was dark and gloomy, foreshadowing his future works of both prose and poetry. Many readers draw a comparison between Liiv and the main character of the story, Villu, who is physically weak but strong in mind.

Liiv continued to write several more short stories, but none are as famous as Vari.

== Mental illness ==
Shortly after Vari was released, Liiv became a patient in a psychiatric clinic in Tartu. Liiv was diagnosed with schizophrenia. He variably thought he was the son of the Emperor Alexander II, the king of Poland and Estonian poet Lydia Koidula. His struggles with mental illness continued until his death.

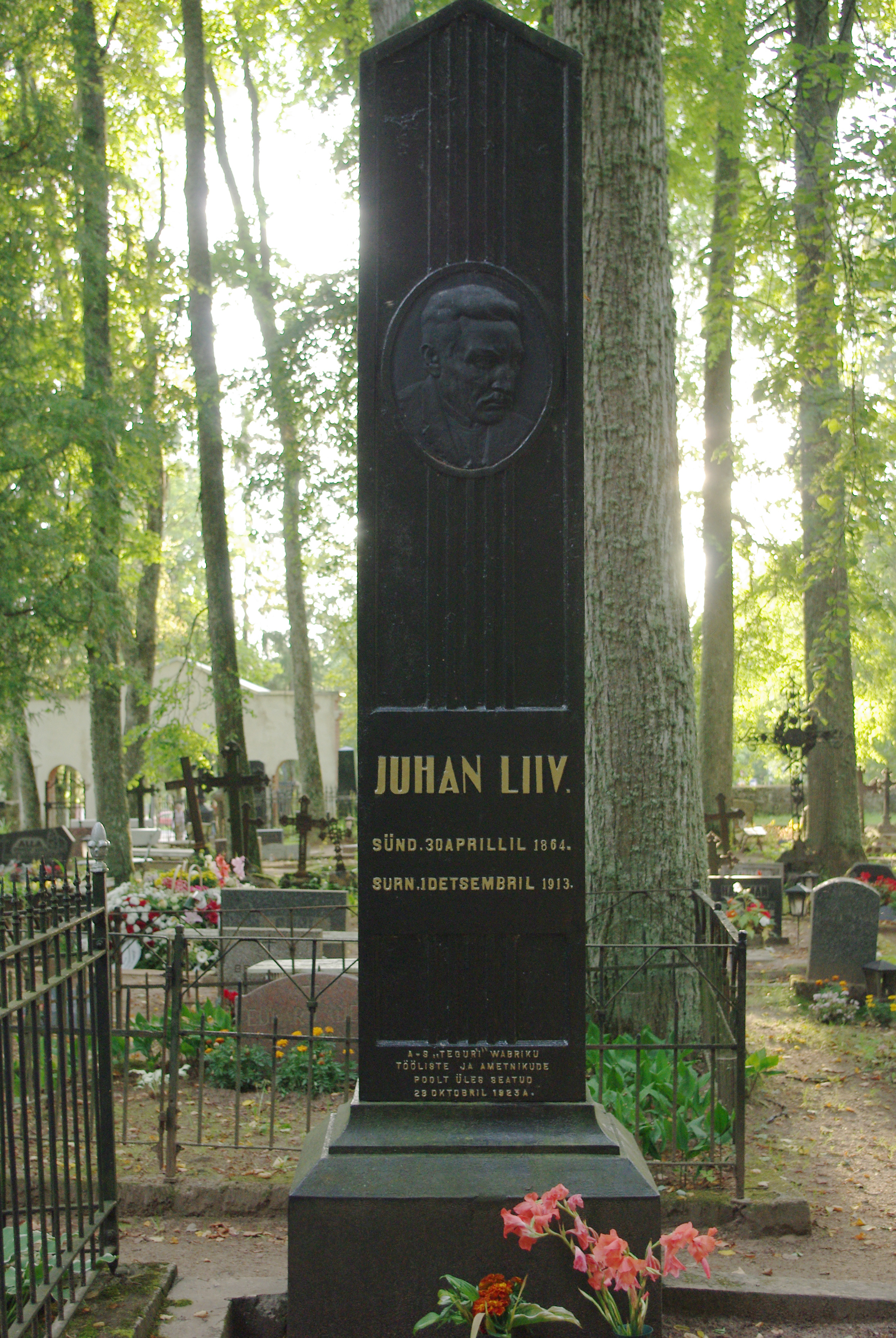
Grave of Juhan Liiv in Alatskivi cemetery.

== Poetry ==
In 1909, Friedebert Tuglas met with Liiv. A book containing 495 poems by Liiv was published late that year.

Many of Liiv's poems are dominated by a sense of gloom, probably brought on by his mental illnesses, poverty and lack of human friendships. The few poems with a less ominous tone describe nature and Liiv's adoration for his country.

His poems include:

- The Axe and the Forest
- Who Does Not Remember the Past (is Living Without the Future)
- To The Poets
- I Saw Estonia Yesterday
- Come Now, Night Darkness
- Cold
- Snowflake

== Death ==
In late 1913, Liiv was found aboard a train without a ticket because he could not afford one. He was thrown off into a deserted area and walked home. By the time he arrived, however, he had been in freezing temperatures for two weeks and had contracted a fatal case of pneumonia. He died on 1 December 1913.

== The Juhan Liiv Prize for Poetry ==
The Juhan Liiv Prize for Poetry was founded in 1965. It is awarded by Peipsiääre Parish on 30 April every year. The prize is a leather shepherd's bag hand-made by a local artist.
