= Tallinn Legends =

Museum in Tallinn

- Tallinna Legendid
- Location: Tallinn, Estonia
- Website: http://tallinnlegends.com/eng/

Tallinn Legends (Estonian: Tallinna Legendid) was a tourist attraction in a form of theatrical and interactive museum in Tallinn, Estonia. The museum recreates historical events and legends that have contributed to the folklore of medieval Tallinn. It uses a mixture of storytelling, live performances and special effects.

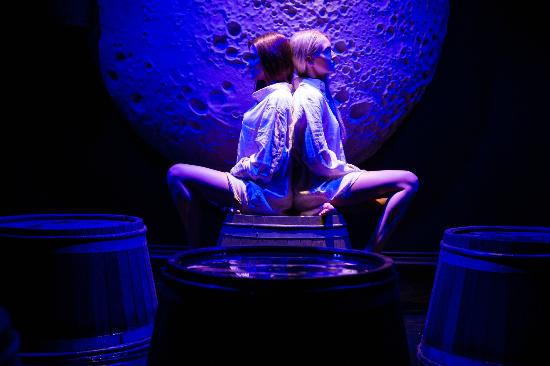
Tallinn Legends sets and actors

== Overview ==
Tallinn Legends is located at Kullassepa St. No 7, next to the oldest town hall building in Tallinn, Estonia. It occupies 600 square meters of underground space featuring 9 separate rooms with 360° themed sets and 7 actors. The museum also organizes free street shows with some of the most popular sets. Visitors are invited to enter in pre-formed groups of 15 or more with carrying capacity of more than 540 people per day. Tallinn Legends is open every day from 11 am till 20 pm and is available in the English, Estonian, Russian and Finnish languages.

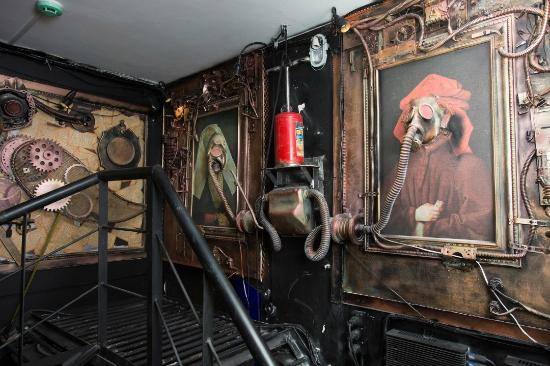
Tallinn Legends sets

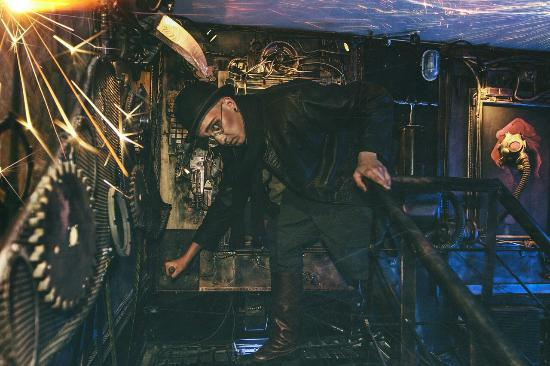
Tallinn Legends sets and actors

== Format ==
Tallinn Legend’s exhibitions contain both entertaining and educational value, as it takes visitors through 9 centuries of Estonian history in the form of theatrical performance. It recreates historical events and medieval legends associated with the city of Tallinn by making use of special lightning and sound effects, along with live performances by professional actors and mechanical dolls, video installations, and storytelling.

The show incorporates events such as the Black Plague, Execution of Johann von Uexkull and construction of St. Olaf’s Church. Visitors are escorted by the actors as they move from one room to another and are encouraged to participate in the 40-minute-long show.

== Sets ==
Saint Olaf’s Church (The Elevator)

Maiden Tower

The Black Plague

Denunciation

The Alchemist

The Mermaid

Execution of Johann von Uexkull
