= Kalevipoeg =

Estonian national epic

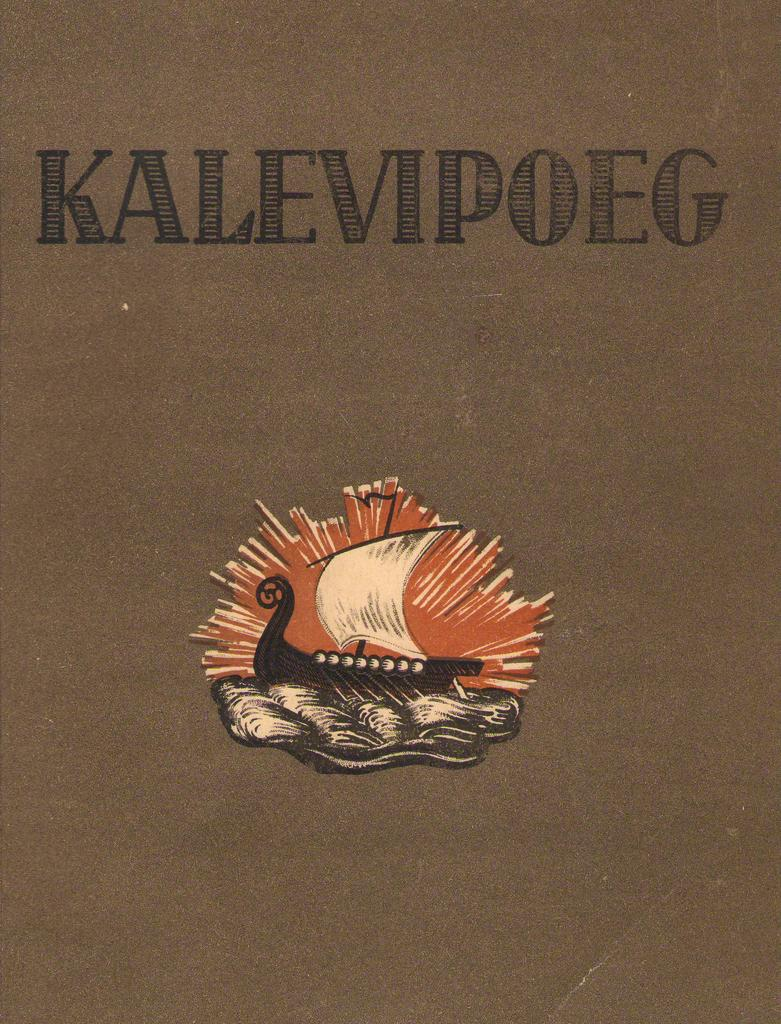
- The front cover of the 1935 edition
- Author: Friedrich Reinhold Kreutzwald
- Audio read by: Eno Raud's version of Kalevipoeg, read by Oskar Punga for the 150th anniversary of the Estonian Students' Society (in Estonian)
- Original title: Kalevipoeg
- Translator: Various
- Language: Estonian and German
- Genre: national epic
- Publisher: Learned Estonian Society
- Publication date: 1857–1861 (published in sequels)
- Media type: book
- Original text: Kalevipoeg at Estonian Wikisource
- Title translates as 'Kalev's Son'

Kalevipoeg (Estonian pronunciation: [ˈkɑ.le.ʋiˈpoe̯ɡ], Kalev's Son) is a 19th-century epic poem by Friedrich Reinhold Kreutzwald which has since been considered the Estonian national epic.

== Origins ==
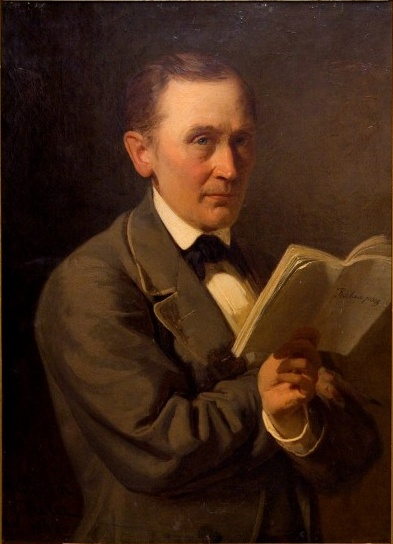
Friedrich Reinhold Kreutzwald (by Johann Köler, 1864)

In pre-Christian ancient Estonia there existed an oral tradition, known as runic song, of legends explaining the origin of the world. Within old Estonian folklore, a benevolent giant by the name of Kalev, Kalevine, Kalevipoiss, Kalevine poisikine and Kalevin poika appears, battling with other giants or enemies of the nation. Early written references are found in Leyen Spiegel in 1641 as "Kalliweh", and in a list of deities published by Mikael Agricola in 1551 as "Caleuanpoiat".

The earliest remaining written reference to Kalevipoeg – also known as Kaleva in Finland – is by many experts considered to be one found in Widsith, also known as The Traveller's Song, which also provides the earliest known written usage of the name Viking, with the spelling wicing. Widsith is a 6th or 7th century Anglo-Saxon poem – or song – of 143 lines, which became copied into the Exeter Book, a manuscript of Old English poetry compiled in the late 10th century. Widsith is for the most part a survey of the people, kings and heroes of Europe in the Germanic Heroic Age.

The following is stated in Widsith:

"Caesar ruled the Greeks, Caelic the Finns ... I was with the Greeks and Finns and also with Caesar ...".

Many historians and folklorists believe Widsith's "Caelic" to be a reference to the ancient Finnic ruler Kaleva/Kalevi, discussed in both the Finnish epic Kalevala and the Estonian epic Kalevipoeg.

== History ==
The main material is taken from Estonian folklore of a giant hero named Kalevipoeg ("Kalev's son"). These tales mainly interpret various natural objects and features as traces of Kalevipoeg's deeds and have similarities with national epics from neighbouring regions, especially the Finnish Kalevala.

In 1839, Friedrich Robert Faehlmann read a paper at the Learned Estonian Society about the legends of Kalevipoeg. He sketched the plot of a national romantic epic poem. In 1850, after Faehlmann's death, Kreutzwald started writing the poem, interpreting it as the reconstruction of an obsolete oral epic. He collected oral stories and wove them together into a unified whole.

The first version of Kalevipoeg (1853; 13,817 verses) could not be printed due to censorship. The second, thoroughly revised version (19,087 verses) was published in sequels as an academic publication by the Learned Estonian Society in 1857–1861. The publication included a translation into German. In 1862, the third, somewhat abridged version (19,023 verses) came out. This was a book for common readers. It was printed in Kuopio, Finland.

== Characters ==
In Estonian (mainly East Estonian) legends, Kalevipoeg carries stones or throws them at enemies, and also uses planks edgewise as weapons, following the advice of a hedgehog. He also forms surface structures on landscape and bodies of water and builds towns. He walks through deep water. Kalevipoeg eventually dies after his feet are cut off by his own sword owing to his own prior—and fatally ambiguous—instructions.

Kalevipoeg was the youngest son of Kalev and Linda, born after his father's death and surpassed his brothers in intelligence and strength. It is often thought that Kalevipoeg's real name was Sohni/Soini, but it actually means simply 'son' and he never had other name than Kalevipoeg. Alevipoeg, Olevipoeg and Sulevipoeg were his brothers.

The character only rarely appears in folk songs. In literature, he was first mentioned by Heinrich Stahl in the 17th century.

== Synopsis ==
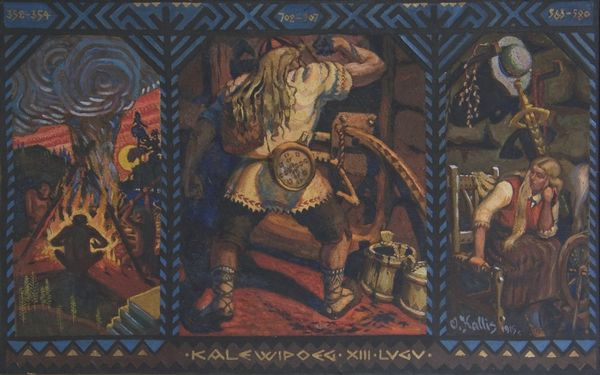
Kalevipoeg in the Netherworld. Oskar Kallis, 1915.

Kalevipoeg travels to Finland in search of his kidnapped mother. During his travel he purchases a sword but kills the blacksmith's eldest son in an argument. The blacksmith places a curse on the sword. On returning to Estonia, Kalevipoeg becomes king after defeating his brothers in a stone hurling competition. He constructs towns and forts and tills the land in Estonia. Kalevipoeg then journeys to the ends of the earth to expand his knowledge. He defeats Satan in a trial of strength and rescues three maidens from hell. War breaks out and destruction visits Estonia. Kalevipoeg's faithful comrades are killed, after which he hands the kingship to his brother Olev and withdraws to the forest, depressed. Crossing a river, the sword cursed by the Blacksmith and previously lost in the river attacks and cuts off his legs. Kalevipoeg dies and goes to heaven. Taara (Thor), in consultation with the other gods, reanimates Kalevipoeg, places his legless body on a white steed, and sends him down to the gates of hell where he is ordered to strike the rock with his fist, thus entrapping hell in the rock. So Kalevipoeg remains to guard the gates of hell.

== Structure ==
=== Poetic structure ===
The epic is written in old Estonian alliterative verse. Approximately one eighth of the verses are authentic; the rest are imitation.

=== Contents and synopses ===
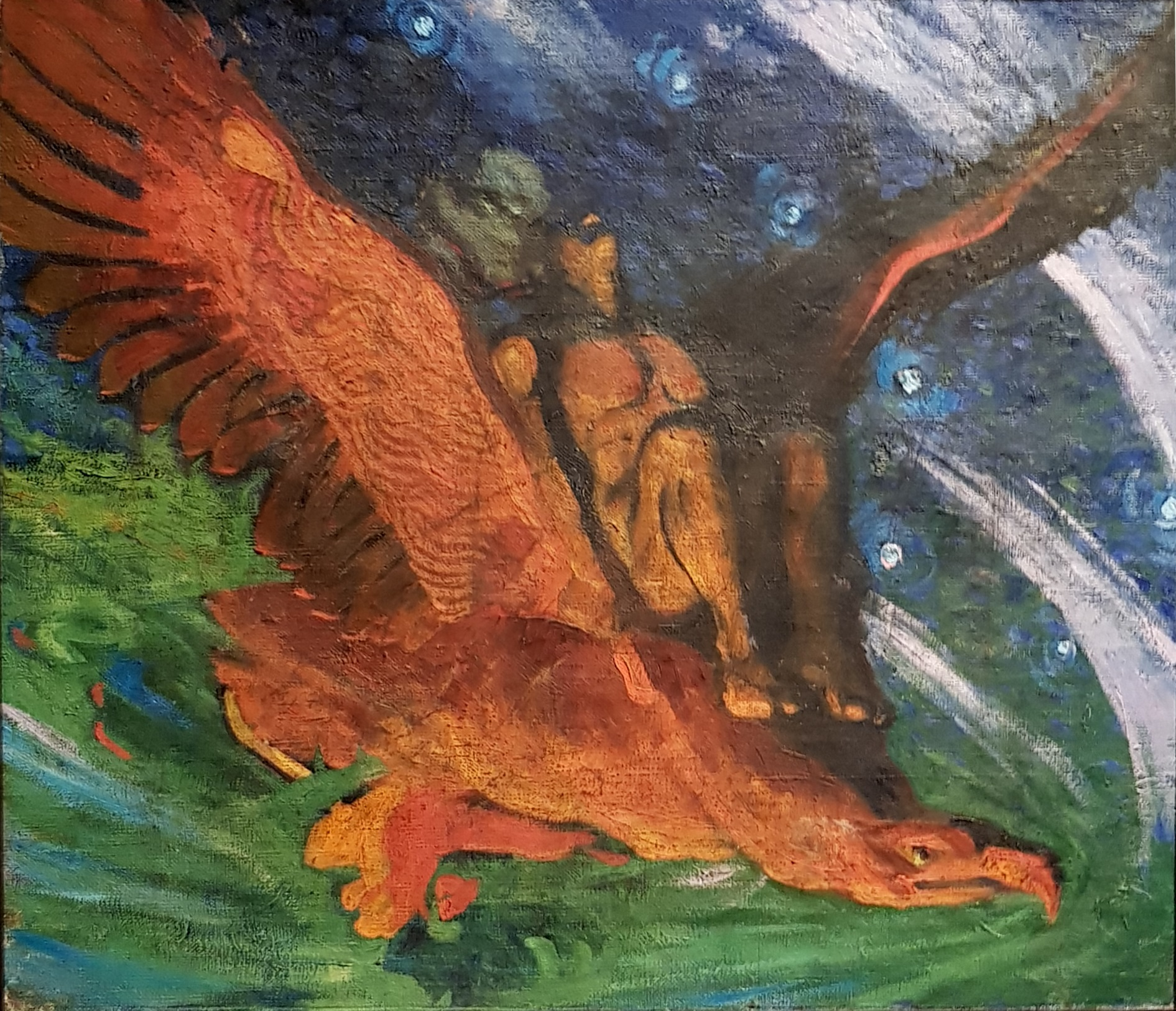
Kalev arrives on the eagle. Oskar Kallis, 1917.

The Kalevipoeg consists of twenty cantos.

Canto I - The marriages of Salme and Linda

Three brothers travel to different places. The youngest is Kalev. He is taken to Estonia on the back of a great eagle. He becomes king of the land.
A widow walks alone and finds a hen, a grouse's egg and a crow on her travels. She takes them home and the former 2 grow into the maidens Salme and Linda. The crow--which she discarded--grows into a servant girl.
Many suitors come to the girls, Salme and Linda. Salme is wooed by the sun, moon and stars themselves. Linda is also wooed by them, but she chooses Kalev, the frightening giant, as her husband. Salme and Linda leave with their respective husbands to complete their lives with them.

Canto II - The death of Kalev

Kalev dies, but before his death prophesies the greatness of his unborn sons.
Linda weeps for seven days and nights over her husband's death. Her tears create Lake Ülemiste, situated in what is now Tallinn. She then prepares him for his funeral and buries him, constructing, as his burial mound, what is now known as the hill of Toompea in the process.
Linda feels the birth of her son approaching and asks the gods for help. Uku (Taara, Thor) comes to her aid with bedding and comfort.
When her son is born, he cries for months and proceeds to tear his clothes and cradle. He grows quickly, learns the trades of the land and plays games.

Canto III - The fate of Linda

The 3 sons of Kalev go on a hunting trip, leaving their mother to attend to her duties at home.
While the men are off hunting, a Finnish sorcerer (who had previously tried to win the hand of Linda and failed), "Tuuslar", sneaks up on Linda and steals her away. She fights hard and manages to get away. She is turned into stone by the gods.
The brothers return and search in vain for their mother. Kalevipoeg asks for help from his father's grave.

The Island Maiden and Kalevipoeg, from a ballet in 1953.

Canto IV - The island maiden

Kalevipoeg swims to Finland. He stops off at an island where he meets and seduces a beautiful maiden.
The maiden hears the name and origin of Kalevipoeg and is horrified. She loses her footing and plunges into the water. Kalevipoeg jumps in after her but is unable to find her so he carries on to Finland.
The maiden's parents check the sea and find an oak and fir tree and other trinkets, but not their daughter.
A song rises up from the sea telling the story of how the maiden was seduced down into the deep.

Canto V - Kalevipoeg and the Finnish sorcerer

The parents of the maiden plant the oak tree they found at the bottom of the sea. In a short time it grows to the sky. The mother finds a small man hiding in the wings of an eagle, he is asked to fell the tree, he agrees on the condition he is let free.
Kalevipoeg reaches Finland and finds the sorcerer in his house. The sorcerer creates a huge army to fend off Kalevipoeg, but he fells them all with his mighty strength and proceeds to question the sorcerer about his mother. When he fails to answer, Kalevipoeg crushes his head with his club and proceeds to weep for his crime.

Canto VI - Kalevipoeg and the swordsmiths

Kalevipoeg visits Ilmarinen, the famous Finnish blacksmith, and asks him to create a sword. He presents various swords. He tests them by striking them against the cliff walls of the smithy, itself. None are adequate, so Ilmarinen presents a sword created at the bequest of Kalev, which pleases Kalevipoeg greatly. This sword, imbued with magical properties and having taken 7 years to forge, Kalevipoeg tests by striking against the anvil upon which it was forged, which it splits in two. This proves the sword's worthiness and he agrees to pay a rich price for it to Ilmarinen.
A great feast and drinking bout is held. Unfortunately, Kalevipoeg argues with, gets angry and fells the head of Ilmarinen's eldest son (who is also intoxicated at this point, as is Kalevipoeg) with the very sword he helped create. Ilmarinen curses the sword. He leaves and later realises his second great crime and weeps.
The great oak tree of the maiden of the island is felled to create a bridge, ships and a hut.

Canto VII - The return of Kalevipoeg

Kalevipoeg takes the sorcerer's boat and returns home. The brothers tell their stories. Kalevipoeg visits his father's grave again.

Canto VIII - The contest and parting of the brothers

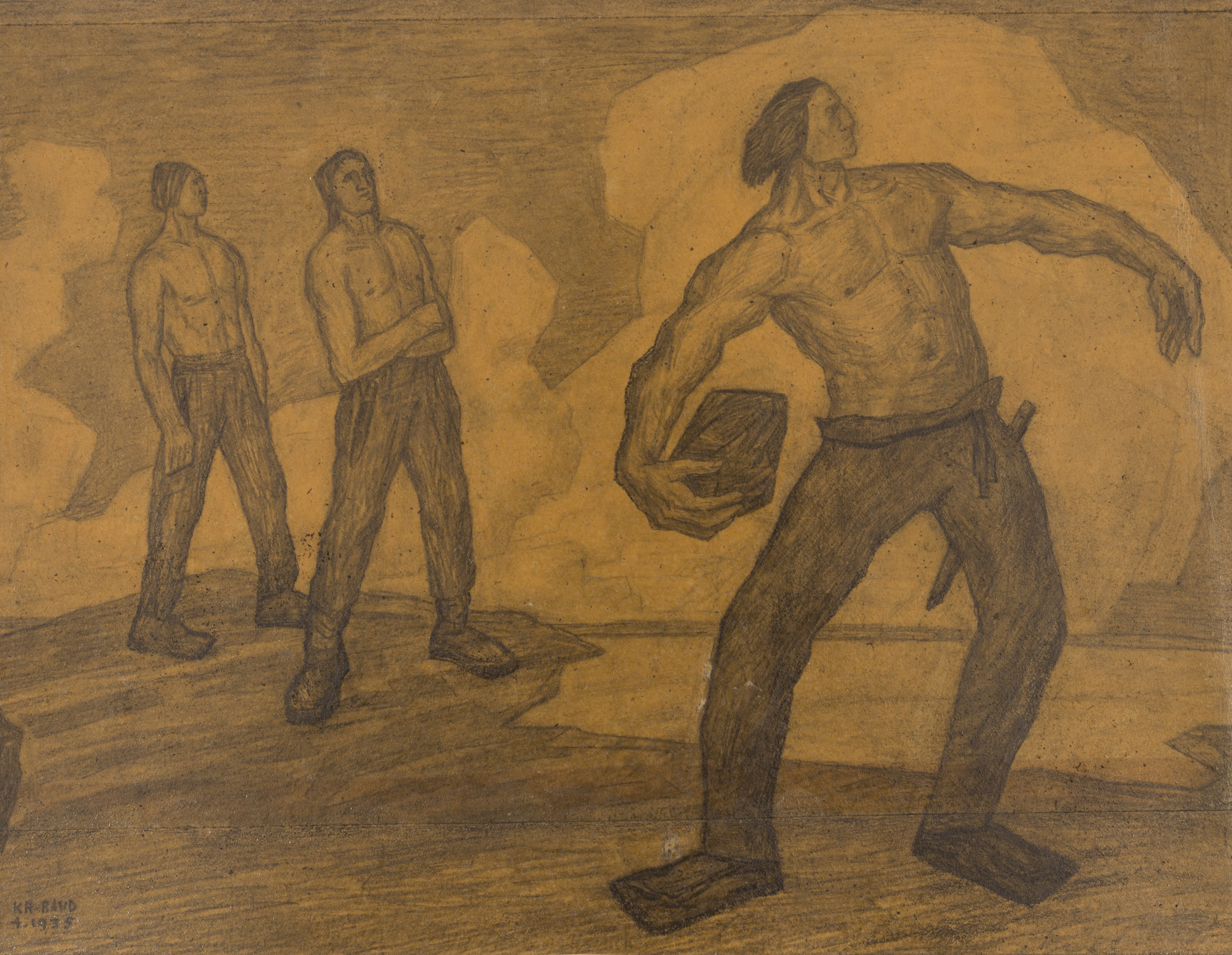
Kalevipoeg throwing the stone. Kristjan Raud, 1935.

Kalev's 3 sons go to a lake's edge and throw stones to decide who will stay and rule the land. Kalevipoeg wins and the brothers part.
Kalevipoeg tends to the land and falls into a deep sleep. During this time, his horse is eaten by wolves.

Canto IX - Rumours of war

Kalevipoeg wakes from a terrible dream that his horse was killed by wolves only to find it is true. He runs through the land, killing all the wild beasts his can find in vengeance. He becomes tired and sleeps again.
A messenger comes to Kalevipoeg and informs him of a battle against his people.

Canto X - The heroes and the Water-Demon

While Kalevipoeg and his cousin Alevipoeg are walking through the country they come across a pair of demons arguing over the ownership of a pool. Alevipoeg drains the pool, but the host water-demon asks him to desist. Alevipoeg tricks the water-demon out of his riches.
Alevipoeg sends his cousin's servant to the water-demons lair. He is teased and runs away. Kalevipoeg wrestles the water-demon and wins.
Kalevipoeg decides to fortify towns for protection, he goes to Lake Peipus to fetch wood. He meets the Air-maiden in a well.

Canto XI - The loss of the sword

Kalevipoeg walks across Lake Peipus but a sorcerer spies him and decides to drown him. His efforts fail.

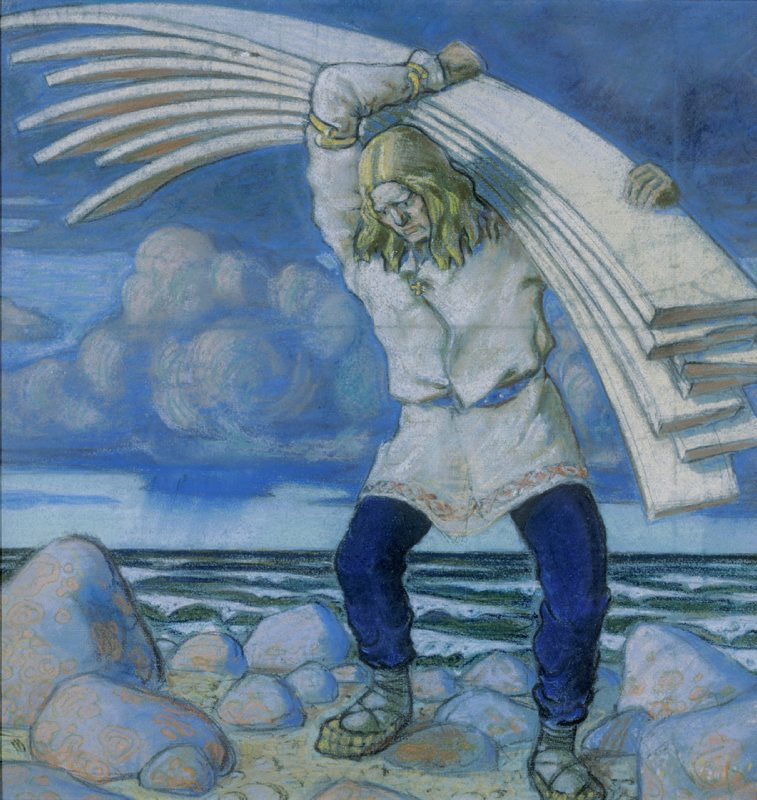
Kalevipoeg carrying wood planks over Lake Peipus. Oskar Kallis, 1914.

The sorcerer steals Kalevipoeg's sword. After an attempt to take it away, he is forced to drop it in a stream. When Kalevipoeg awakes he goes hunting for his sword. When he finds it, he consults it and finds it is happier in the stream. He leaves it there, but orders it to cut off the feet of the sorcerer should he ever return.
Kalevipoeg carries on in this journey and meets a man of human stature who regales him with a story of giants. Kalevipoeg is amused and offers his protection. He places the man in his wallet.

Canto XII - The fight with the sorcerer's sons

The three sons of the sorcerer attack Kalevipoeg while he is walking on his way. He fights hard but gains no ground until he hears and heeds the advice of a small voice from the underbrush. He defeats the sorcerer's sons and asks his helper to show himself. After some persuasion, his helper comes out of the underbrush and Kalevipoeg cuts some of his coat for the small creature to cover himself up, but only cuts enough to cover his back.
Kalevipoeg discovers that man in his wallet is dead and grieves. He falls asleep and is enchanted by the sorcerer. He sleeps for 7 weeks and dreams about Ilmarine's workshop.

Canto XIII - Kalevipoeg's first journey to Hell

On his return journey, Kalevipoeg sees demons cooking at the entrance to a cave. He enters the cave and finds the palace of Devil. He breaks in and meets 3 maidens.
Kalevipoeg and the maidens talk and they give him a magic hat and rod. He promises to free them from Devil and find them husbands.

Canto XIV - The palace of Devil

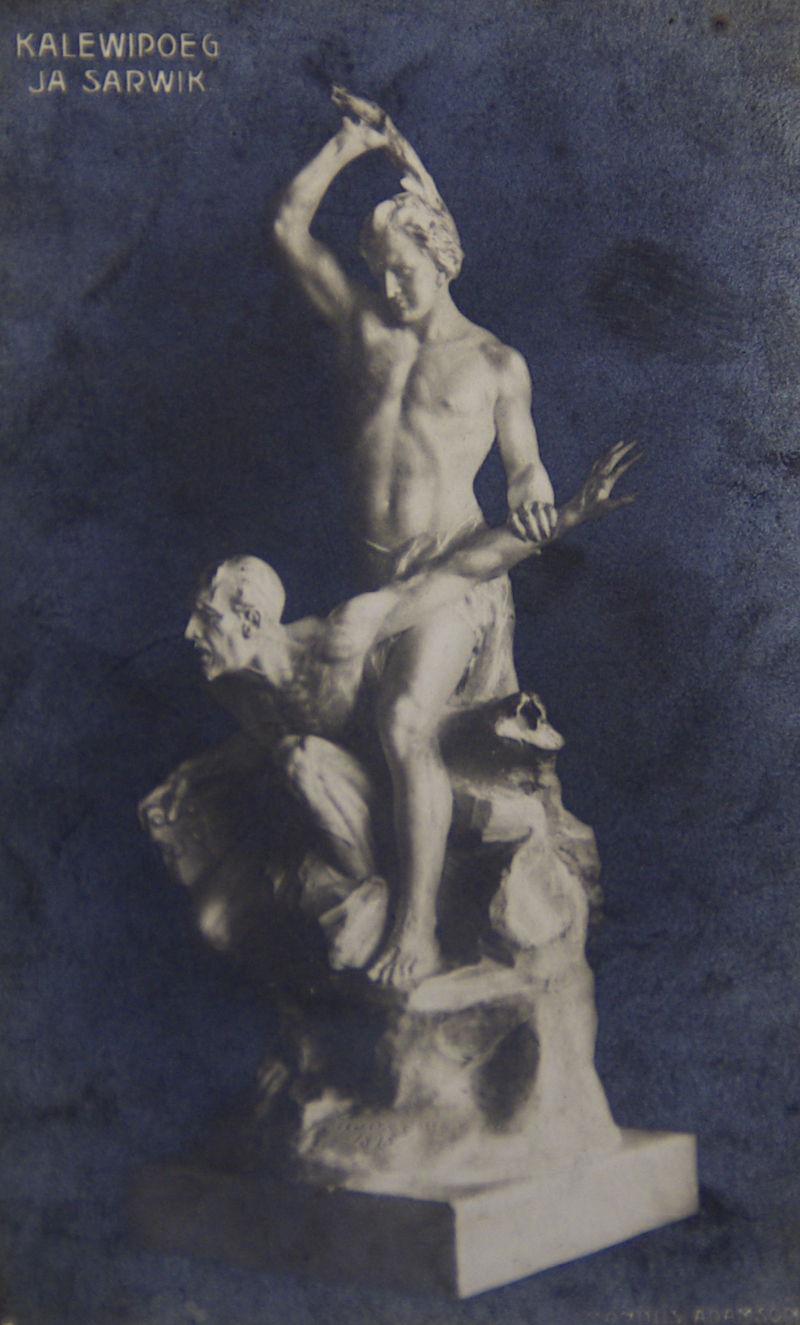
Kalevipoeg and Devil, sculpture by Amandus Adamson (1914)

The 3 maidens show Kalevipoeg around Devil's palace. It is an intricate and massive castle. They confess that they are immortal and ever radiant, but they are unhappy and have no joys in life. Kalevipoeg tells them he will rescue them and he makes plans to wrestle with Devil. The 2 oldest maidens switch Devil's magical liquors so he will be weakened when he drinks. Kalevipoeg uses the magic hat to make himself appear smaller.
When Devil returned, he demanded Kalevipoeg explain himself. Kalevipoeg makes his challenge and the 2 combatants wrestle viciously. When they stop for a rest, Kalevipoeg uses the hat to regain his old size and strength and bashes Devil into the ground.
Kalevipoeg and the maidens flee from Devil's palace. Kalevipoeg burns the magic hat much to the distress of the maidens.

Canto XV - The marriage of the sisters

The maidens and Kalevipoeg are chased by demons. The youngest maiden uses the magic rod to create a torrent of water and a bridge to take them to safety.
Tühi questions Kalevipoeg about his visit to Hell and his fight with Devil, Kalevipoeg answers sarcastically.
The maidens are married to Alevipoeg and Sulevipoeg but the second maiden is kidnapped by a sorcerer. They hunt for her, kill the sorcerer and recover her, she is married to their friend Olevipoeg.

Canto XVI - The voyage of Kalevipoeg

Kalevipoeg ponders a voyage to the end of the world. A great ship called Lennuk is created.
Kalevipoeg meets a Laplander called Varrak who tells him that the end of the world is not reachable. He offers to take them home. Kalevipoeg says he needs no help to return home but would be grateful if Varrak would take them to the world's end. The voyage to an island of fire, steam and smoke where Sulevipoeg gets scorched.
They are found by a giant child who carries them to her father. The father requests that they solve his riddles for their release. They are successful and the daughter takes them to their boat and blows them out to sea.
The group carries on in its journey north. They witness the northern lights and eventually come to an island of dog men. After some troubles, peace is made with the dog men and the leader of them tells Kalevipoeg that he has wasted his time. Kalevipoeg finally decides to go home.

Canto XVII - The heroes and the dwarf

Magnificent fortified cities have been built by Olevipoeg. Alevipoeg and Sulevipoeg have also built fine cities. Kalevipoeg names Olevipoeg's city after his mother, Lindanisa (modern day Tallinn).
News of a great invasion force reaches Kalevipoeg and he sets of to fight in a long pitched battle, during which he loses his horse in the sheer depth of gore created during the battle.
After the battle is over and the spoils handed out, Kalevipoeg and his friends set out to find further invaders. They come across an old woman cooking and settle down for the night.
During the night a dwarf appears and asks each of the heroes if he can take a sip from the pot of soup the old woman was cooking. All but Kalevipoeg allow him to and he proceeds to drink the whole pot, grow to the sky then vanish.
After the dwarf has appeared to all of the heroes the daughters of the Meadow Queen dance and sing and tell the tale of adventures still to come to Kalevipoeg.

Canto XVIII - Kalevipoeg's journey to Hell

Kalevipoeg wakes in the night and finds the gates to Hell. He enters and proceeds into the depths of hell itself, aided by creatures along the way.
Kalevipoeg comes across a large iron bridge and the huge army of Devil. He battles hard and eventually gets over the bridge to the palace of Devil. He beats his way in and is greeted by a vision of his mother and Devil's mother.

Canto XIX - The last feast of the heroes

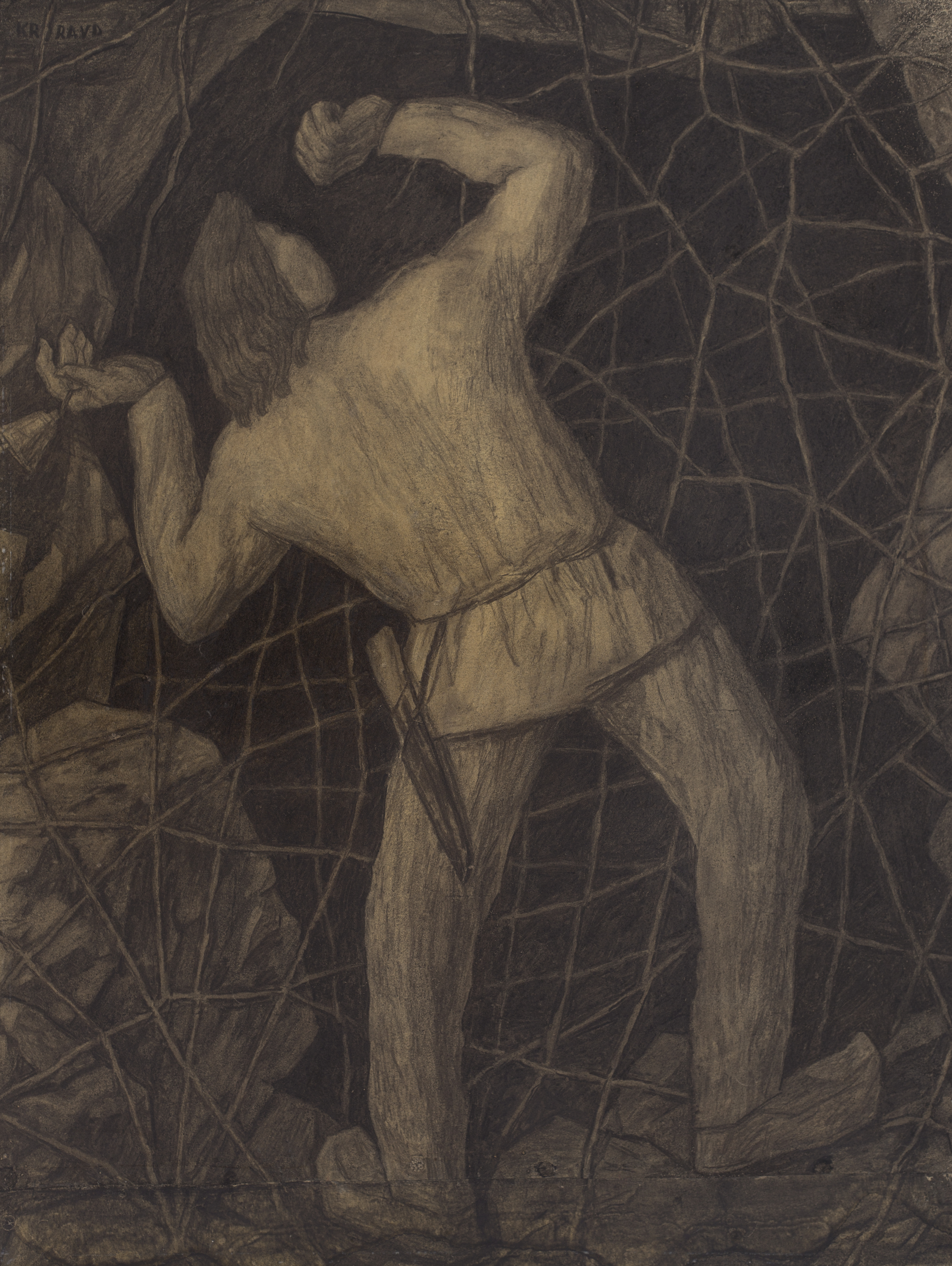
Kalevipoeg Destroying Webs on His Way to Hell ca. 1935. Kristjan Raud.

Kalevipoeg and Devil have a lengthy wrestling match in which Kalevipoeg prevails. He binds Devil heavily with chains, takes a small treasure and leaves for the world of men.
Kalevipoeg and his friends have a meal of ox which Alevipoeg was able to kill.
Kalevipoeg and his friends return to Lindanisa and a great feast and drinking bout begins. Many songs are sung and much joy is in the air. There is news of yet another invasion from all sides of the country by many enemies.
Varrak departs for Lapland, taking with him a book of wisdom, given to him by Kalevipoeg, much to the dismay of the Olevipoeg and Sulevipoeg.
Many refugees arrive with news of the impending battles. Kalevipoeg consults his Father's grave, but no answer comes.

Canto XX - Armageddon

Kalevipoeg and his friends prepare for war. Kalevipoeg buries his treasure and protects it with incantations to Taara.
Kalevipoeg and his friends engage in a fierce battle which lasts many days and in which Kalevipoeg loses his horse and Sulevipoeg is badly injured. Sulevipoeg eventually dies.
Olevipoeg builds a large bridge over the river Võhandu and the army proceeds over to engage the remaining enemy. The battle rages hard for many days until the heroes are exhausted and decide to take a drink. Alevipoeg slips and falls into the lake and drowns.
Kalevipoeg is so grief-stricken he abdicates and places his kingdom in the hands of Olevipoeg. Kalevipoeg leaves for a peaceful life on the banks of the river Koiva. He does not get the peace he desires and is annoyed by many visitors, some aggressive. He wanders around the country annoyed by these intrusions and makes his way to Lake Peipus. He wades into Kääpa, the brook where his old sword lay, and the sword keeps its promise to cut off the feet of anyone who dares wade in the brook. Unfortunately, Kalevipoeg had forgotten this promise and his feet are cut off.
Kalevipoeg dies and is taken to heaven. However, he is deemed too valuable and is reanimated in his old body to stand guard for eternity at the gates of Hell to keep watch on Devil and his demons. He is there still tied to the gates of Hell by his hand, which is locked in a rock.

== Comparative mythology ==
Kalevipoeg had his legs amputated by a magical sword. This is similar to the Hurrian mythic theme of the amputation of the feet of Ullikummi by a supernatural knife. According to Eustathius, the Telkhines were likewise beings without feet.

== Influences ==
Kalevipoeg has been referenced in both official contexts and in popular culture. The Estonian Declaration of Independence begins with a passage that quotes a god in Canto XX, right after the death of the protagonist Kalevipoeg: "In the course of centuries never have the Estonian people lost their desire for independence. From generation to generation have they kept alive the hidden hope that in spite of enslavement and oppression by hostile invaders the time will come to Estonia 'when all splints, at both end, will burst forth into flames' and when 'Kalev will come home to bring his children happiness'. Now that time has arrived."

== Editions ==
- The Hero of Estonia. And other studies in the romantic literature of that country - William Forsell Kirby. 1895
- Kalevipoeg: An Ancient Estonian Tale - Friedrich Reinhold Kreutzwald, Trans. Jüri Kurman - ISBN 0-918542-02-2. 1982
- Kalevipoeg: the Estonian National Epic - Friedrich Reinhold Kreutzwald, Trans. Triinu Kartus. Estonian Literary Museum, 2011

== See also ==
- Toell the Great
- Kalevala – 1835 Finnish epic poem compiled by Elias Lönnrot
- Estonian mythology
- Lāčplēsis – Latvian national epic
