= August Weizenberg =

Estonian sculptor

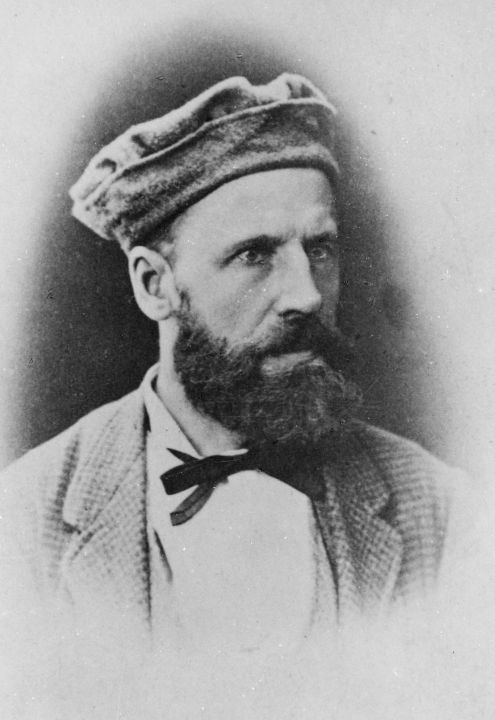
- August Weizenberg in Rome
- Born: 6 April 1837; Kanepi, Estonia (then part of Russian Empire)
- Died: 22 November 1921 (aged 84); Tallinn, Estonia
- Known for: Sculpture

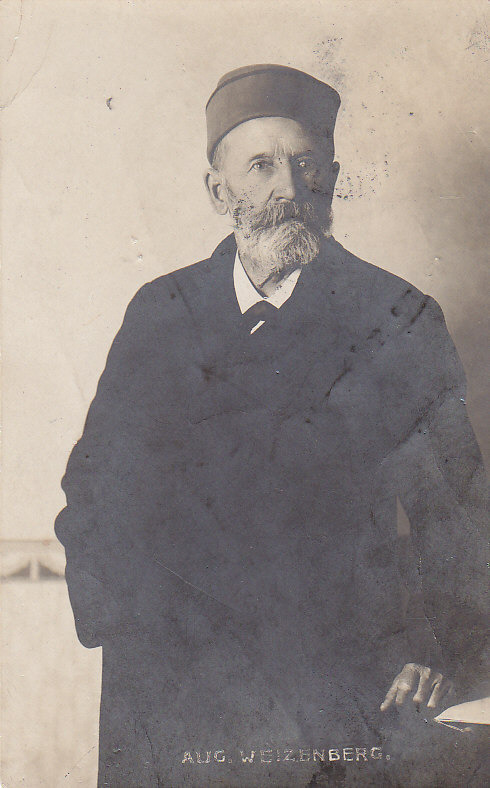
August Weizenberg, 1916

August Ludwig Weizenberg (6 April 1837 – 22 November 1921) was an Estonian sculptor.

== Life ==
Weizenberg was born in the inn of Ritsike, near Kanepi, southeast Estonia. Weizenberg's father was a shoemaker and he learnt how to carve wood in Erastvere from 1858 to 1862. During the 1860s, he worked as a cabinetmaker in Frankfurt and Berlin. Thanks to a sponsorship from Friedrich Reinhold Kreutzwald, he travelled to Saint Petersburg, where he was trained by Alexander von Bock. He later studied at the Imperial Academy of Arts, and from 1870 to 1873 at the Academy of Fine Arts, Munich. From 1873 to 1890, he lived in Rome.

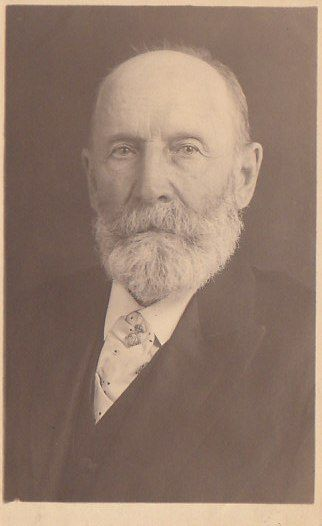
August Weizenberg, 1917

== Works ==
- Linda, 1920
