= Heinrich Stahl =

Baltic German clergyman and Estonian language enthusiast

Heinrich Stahl (circa 1598/1600 Tallinn – 17 April 1657 Narva) was a Baltic-German prelate who worked in Estonia. He is mostly known by his first grammar of Estonian language.

== Education and clerical career ==
In 1617, he entered in Rostock University. In 1621, he continued its studying in Wittenberg University and ended it in 1622. In 1620s, he returned to Estonia and started his clerical career in Järva County and Viru County. In 1638, he was chosen to the senior preacher at the Tallinn Dome Church, rector of the Consistorium and Dean of Harjumaa.

== Death from plague ==
He died in 1657 in Narva because of plague.

== Language works ==
- 1630: "Kurtze und einfältige Fragen die Grundstücke des Christenthumbs betreffend" ('Short and simple questions on the Essentials of Christianity')
- 1632-1638 "Hand vnd Hauszbuches Für die Pfarherren, vnd Hauszväter Ehstnischen Fürstenthumbs" ('Hand- and Home-book for the clergy and fathers of the Principality of Estonia')
- 1637 "Anführung zu der Esthnischen Sprach" ('Introduction to the Estonian Language')
- 1641 and 1649 "Leyen Spiegel" ('The Layman’s Mirror', I, 1641; II, 1649)
