= Leyen Spiegel =

Estonian and German book of sermons

Leyen Spiegel is a two-volume book of sermons, with parallel texts in Estonian and German. It was written by the Baltic-German prelate Heinrich Stahl and published in Tallinn in 1641 and 1649. It is one of the oldest complete books in the Estonian language to have survived over the centuries. An original copy is held in the National Library of Estonia.
