= Oskar Kallis =

Estonian artist (1892–1918)

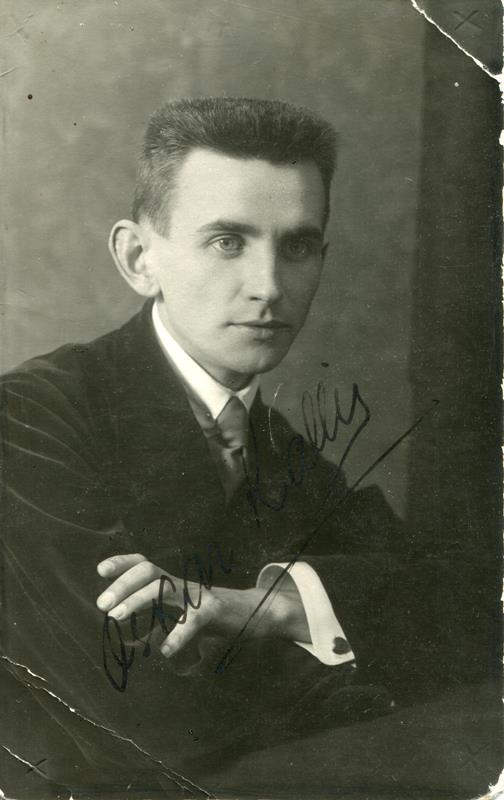
- Oskar Kallis c. 1913-1915
- Born: 23 November 1892; Tallinn, present-day Estonia
- Died: 1 January 1918 (aged 25); Yalta, present-day Ukraine
- Movement: National Romanticism

Oskar Kallis (Tallinn, November 23, 1892 – Yalta, 1 January 1918) was an Estonian artist, one of the main representatives of the Estonian national romanticism.

Kallas studied in 1907 and 1913 to 1916 in the studio of the artist Ants Laikmaa, and in 1912-1913 studied design at the Estonian Artist Society (Eesti Kunstiselts). He participated in 1917 in the establishment of the artistic association Vikerla. He was particularly influenced by the Finnish painter Akseli Gallen-Kallela, he devoted himself especially in his short career to the illustration of the Estonian national epic Kalevipoeg, creating about 40 works. He also designed ethnographically styled furniture and textiles. He died of tuberculosis in Crimea in 1918.

== Selected works ==
- "Lennuk" (1914)
- "Sulevipoja kalm" (1914)
- "Kalevipoeg kasvatab tamme" (1914/1915)
- "Kalevipoeg kellukest helistamas" (1914/1915),
- "Kalevipoeg allmaailmas" (1915)
- "Manala uks" (1915)

== Selected paintings ==
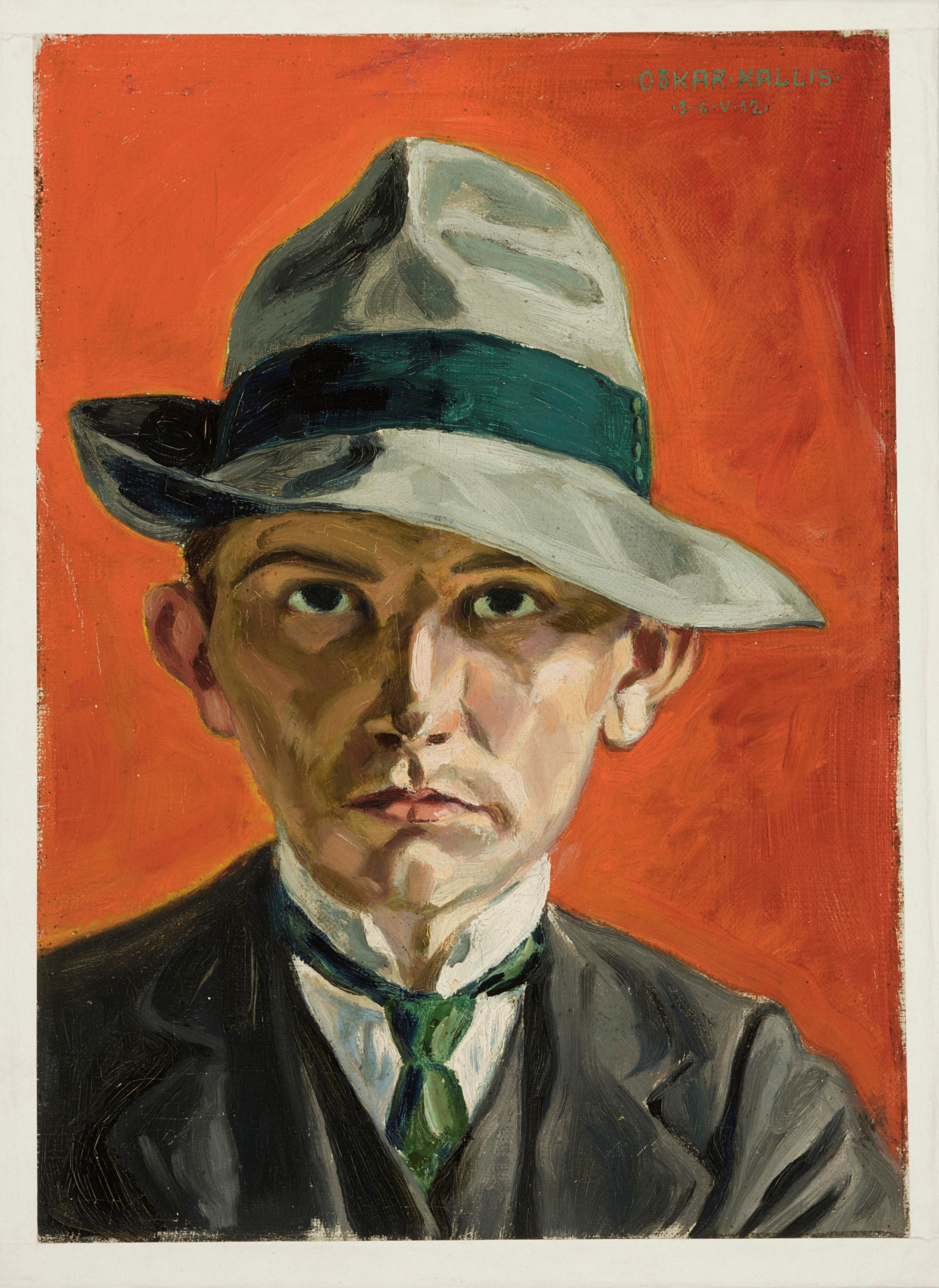
"Self-portrait" (1912)

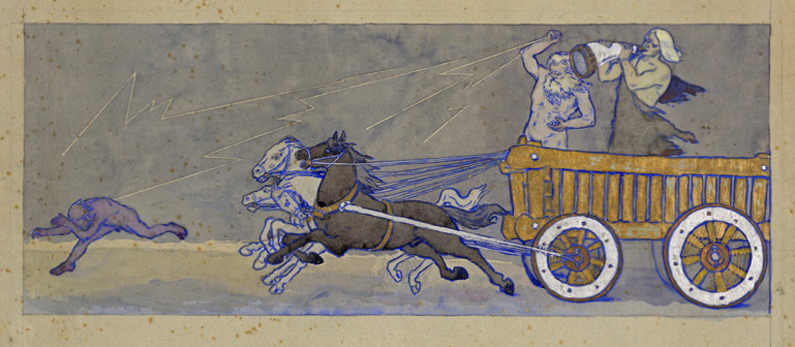
"Pikker" (1914)

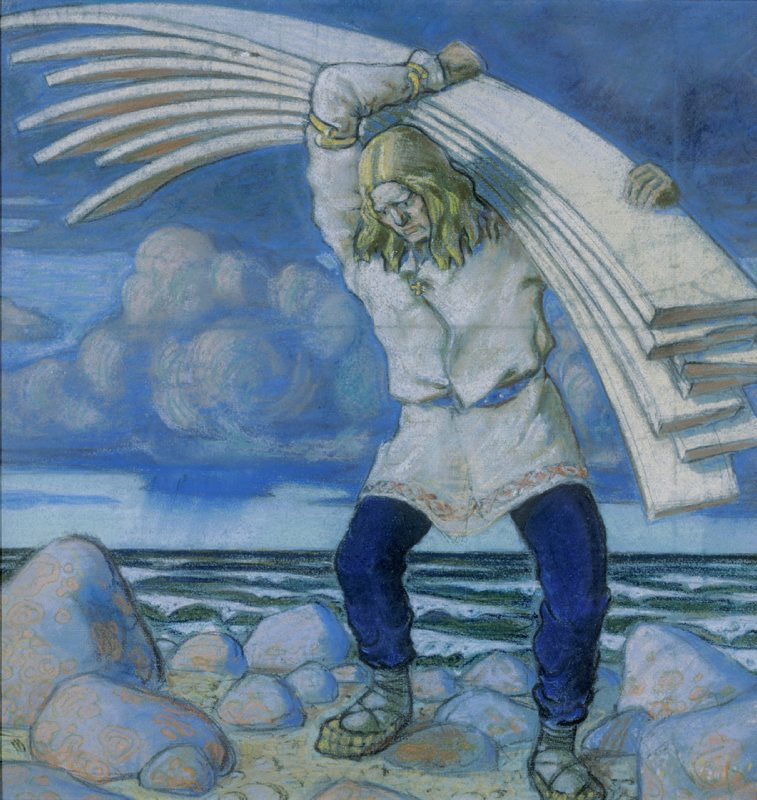
"Kalevipoeg laudu kandmas" (1914)

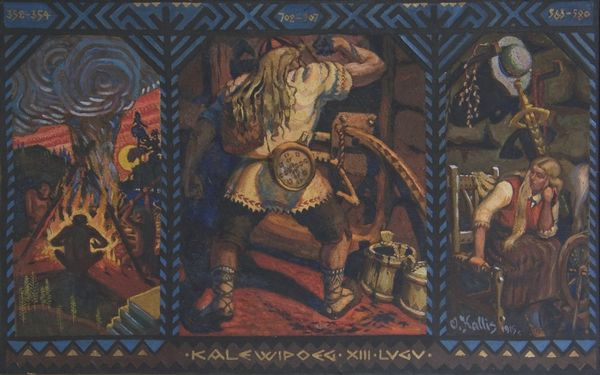
"Kalevipoeg in the Netherworld" (1915)

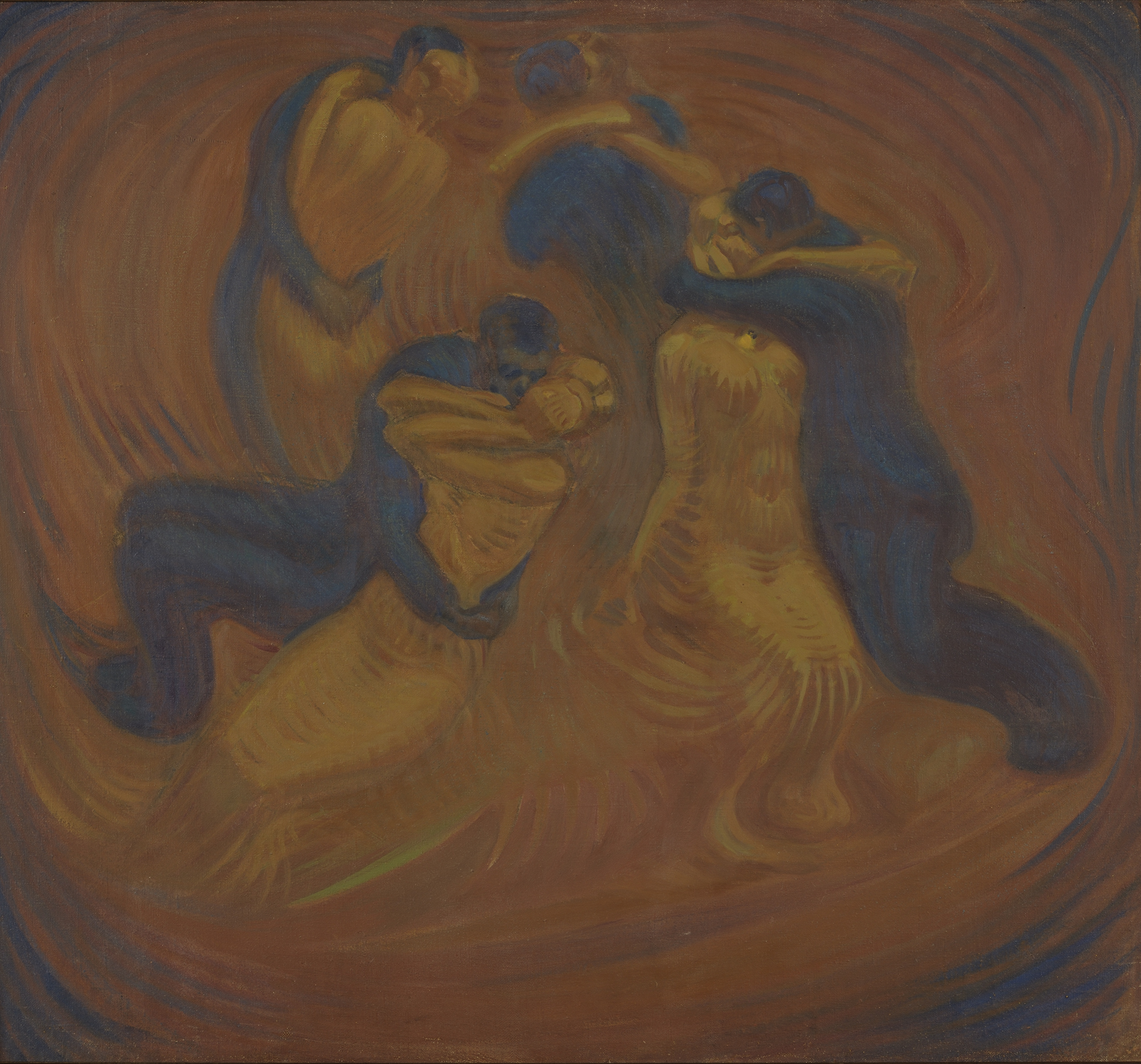
"Dance of Life" (1916)

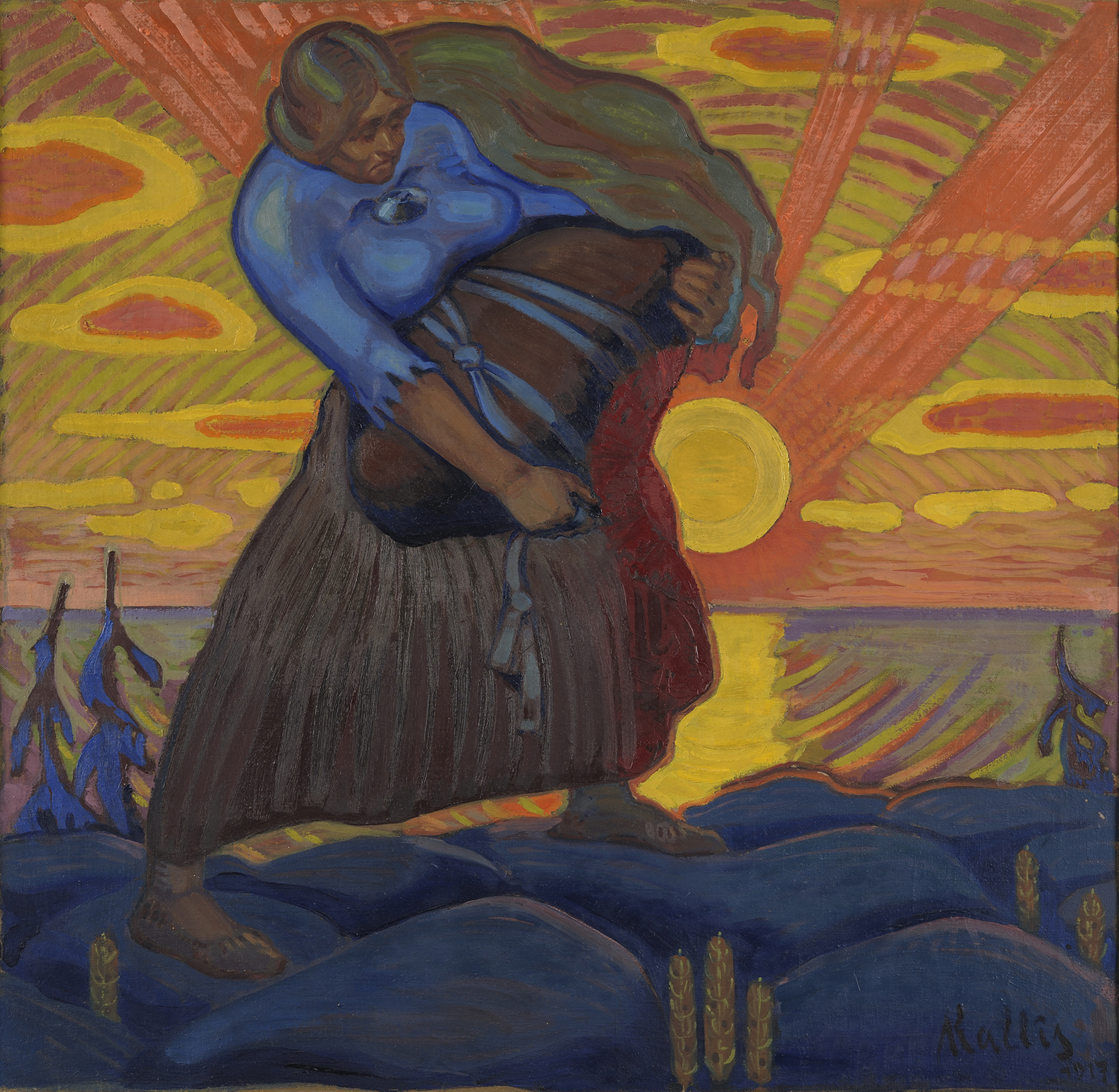
"Linda Carrying a Stone" (1917)

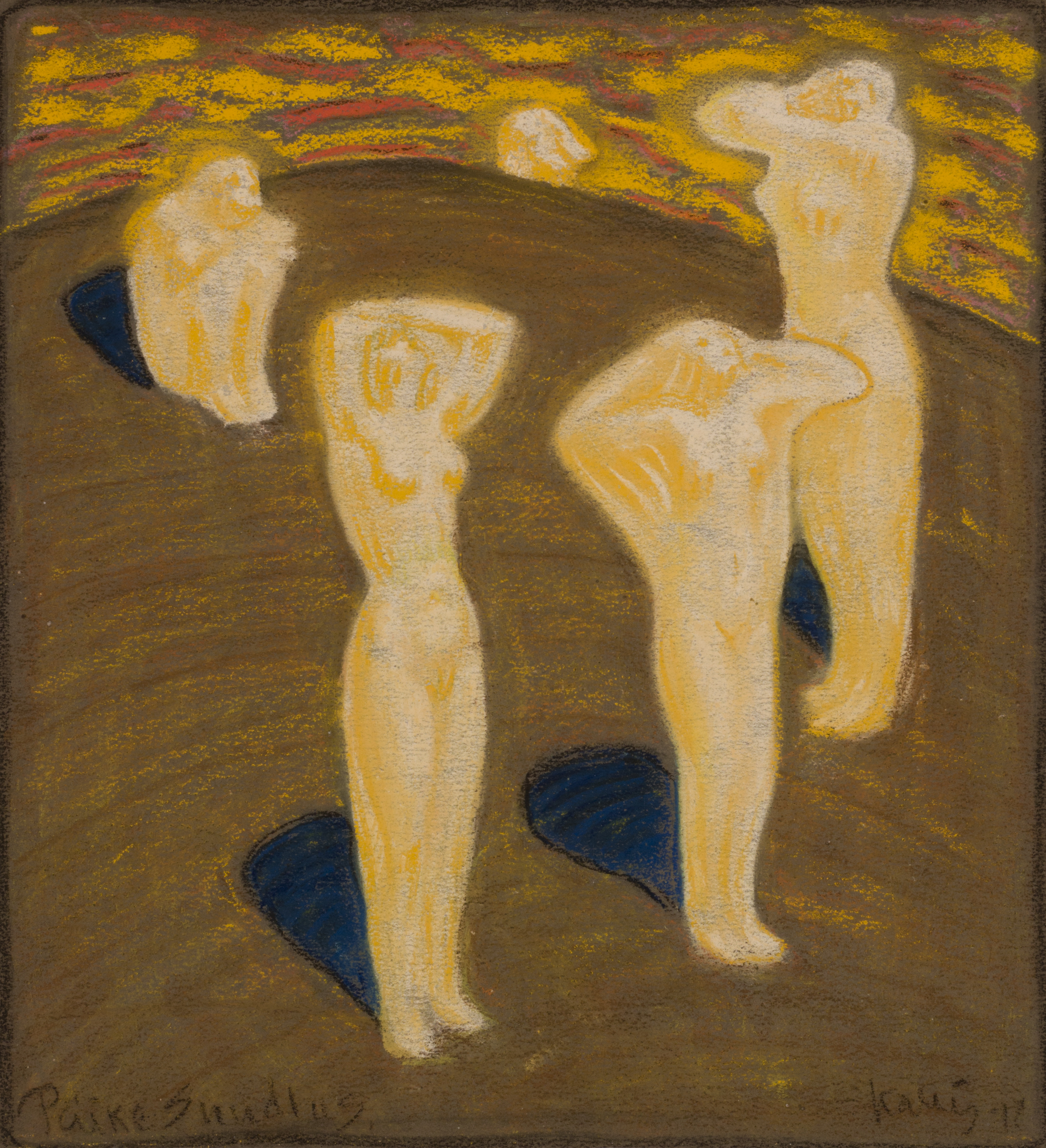
"Kiss from a Sun" (1917)
