= Roman Haavamägi =

Estonian sculptor, painter and graphic artist

Roman Gottfried Haavamägi (until 1937 Espenberg; 15 February 1891 Tallinn – 3 January 1964 Haapsalu) was an Estonian sculptor, painter, and graphic artist.

From 1914 to 1917 he studied at the Tallinn Art Industrial School (Estonian: Tallinna Kunsttööstuskool, now, the Estonian Academy of Arts), and at Nikolai Triik's studio. He started working as a freelance artist in 1922.

== Gallery ==
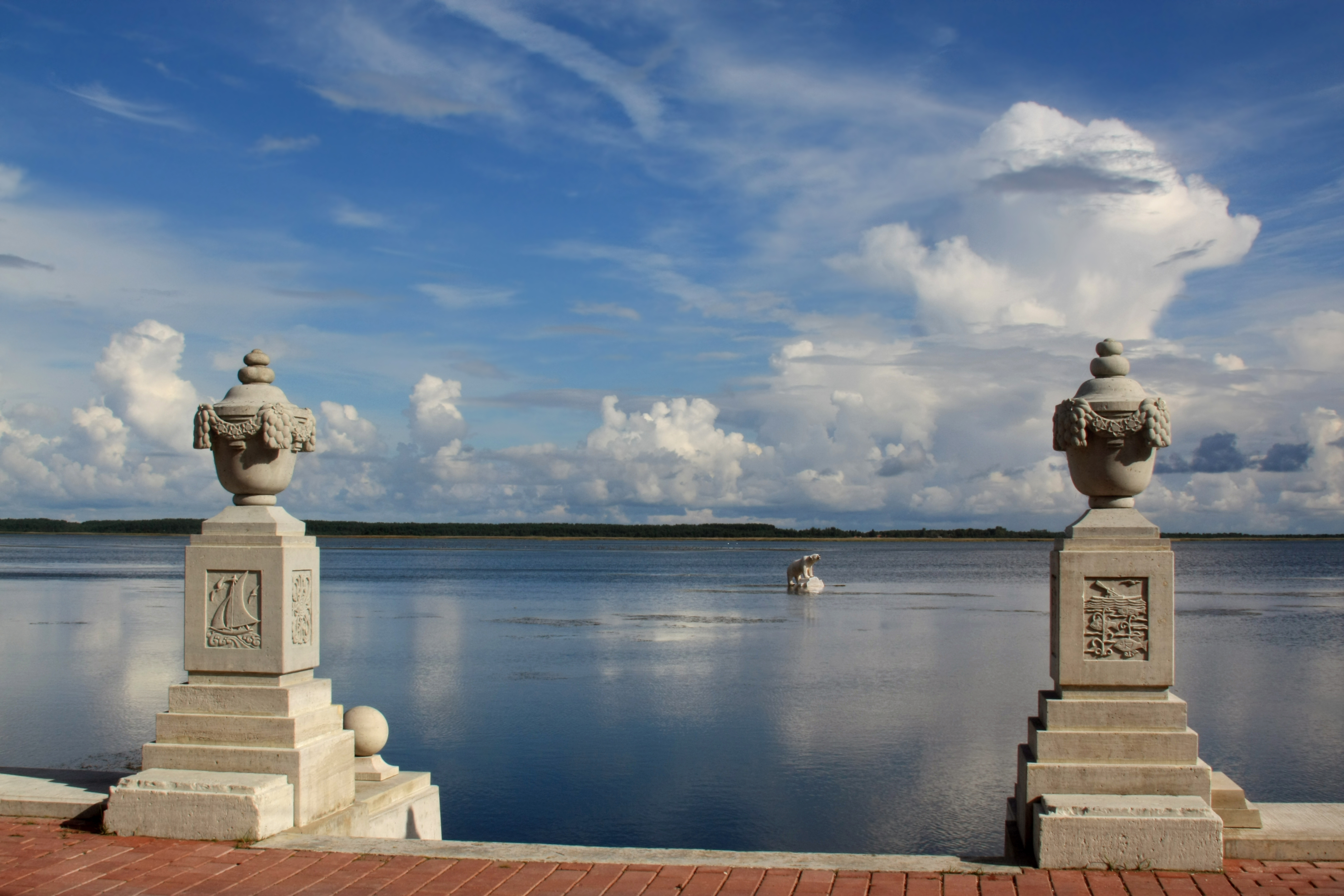
Sculptures at Haapsalu Promenade

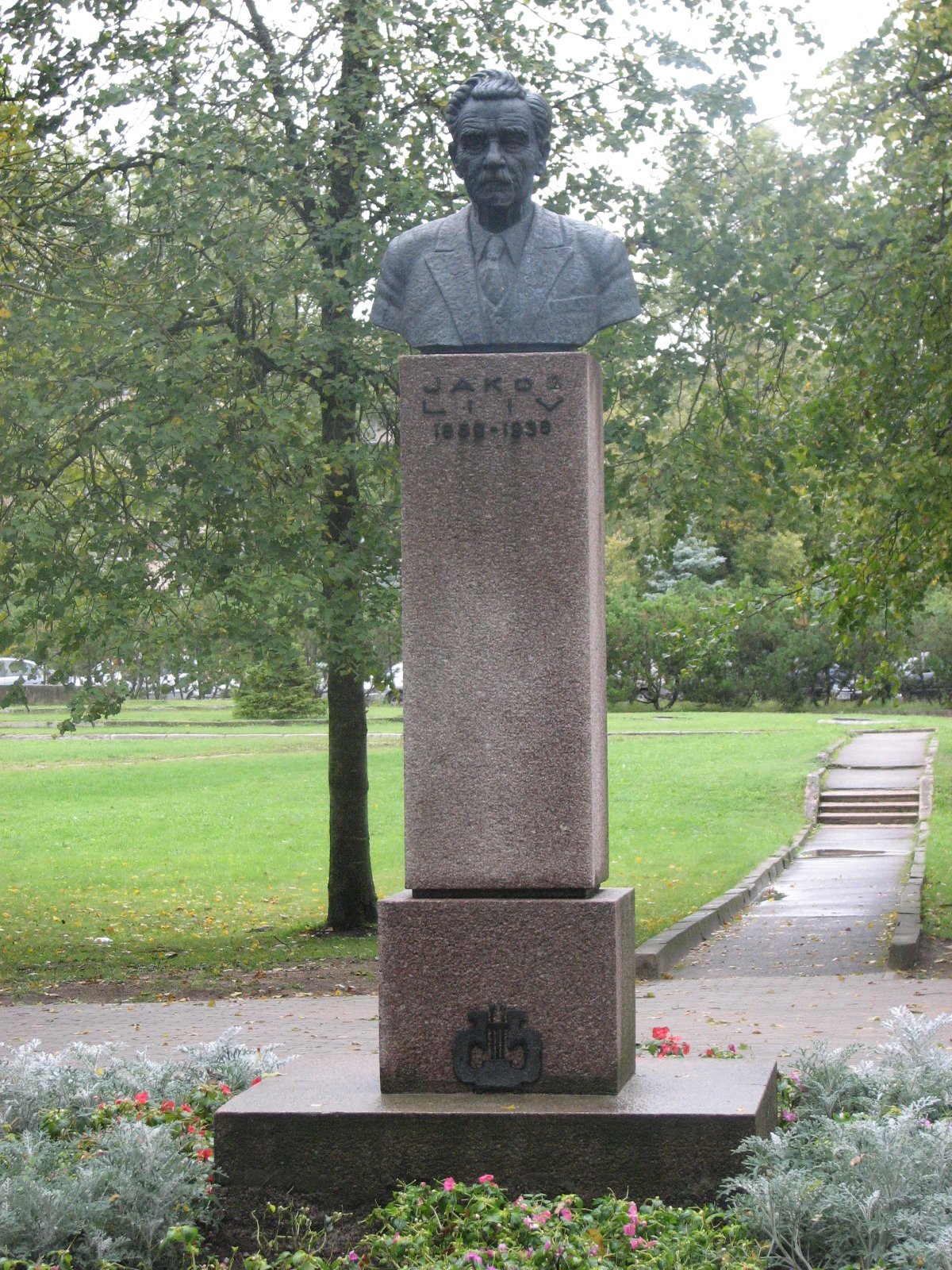
Statue of Jakob Liiv in Väike-Maarja
