= Kainuu Sámi people =

Sámi ethno-linguistic group, Finland

Kainuu Sámi people (Finnish: kainuunsaamelaiset) is a modern term used to refer to the people who lived in the area of Kainuu, Finland until the 18th century and spoke a Sámi language dubbed Kainuu Sámi.

== Terminology ==
According to researcher of Finno-Ugric languages Tapani Salminen, the idea of the existence of a Kainuu Sámi language that is separate from Kemi Sámi is not well reasoned. In Kainuu oral tradition, the Kainuu Sámi are called lappalaiset 'Lapps'. Historian Matti Huurre questioned if the term "Sámi" can be used of "Lapps" south of Lapland, but as linguistic evidence shows they spoke Sámic languages, linguist Ante Aikio has referred to these extinct and unknown Sámi languages which existed in more southern parts of Finland and Karelia as "Lakeland Sámi languages" in contrast to the surviving Lapland Sámi languages.

== History ==
The oldest archeological discoveries of human inhabitation in the area of Kainuu are from around 6800–6000 BCE. It is thought that around the Bronze Age and Early Iron Age (c. 1000–0 BCE), the people spoke a Proto-Sámic language, but archaeological findings culturally linked to Sámi have not been found this south. The spread of the Asbestos-ceramic culture in the north of Fennoscandia has been thought to be a sign of the area turning Sámi. The inhabitants of Kainuu in the Early Iron Age were likely then hunter-gathering Sámi, even if genetically and linguistically differing from modern Sámi. Prior to Proto-Sámic, the hypothetical languages spoken in the area have been dubbed Paleo-Lakelandic, which left loanwords into the later Lakeland Sámi languages of the area and Kainuu place names that are still in use.

There is no information of the numbers of Kainuu Sámi individuals in historical records. If they had the same population density as Forest Sámi in Finland in 1600 CE, there would've been around 350 individuals living in Kainuu. Kainuu Sámi started to move to more remote areas when Ostrobothnians and Karelians started hunting and fishing in Kainuu and likely also taxed the Kainuu Sámi. Centuries later, due to overpopulation in Savo, Savonians started moving to the coasts of Lake Oulujärvi in the 1530s. In the 1550s, King Gustav Vasa of Sweden encouraged Finns to move to the area to fill it with Swedish citizens and thus claim the area for the Swedish kingdom, even though the Treaty of Nöteborg in 1323 had assigned the area to Russia. Tax exemption of five years was offered, though some had to be forced to move. Those Kainuu Sámi who did not move to more remote areas mixed with the Finnish arrivals and assimilated into the agricultural communities. In Sotkamo, it was said that the Lapps left in 1621 whereas in Suomussalmi, 10 out of the 89 families were marked as Lapps in the early 1700s.

According to T. I. Itkonen, the last Sámi families of Kuhmo were Have, Heltta, Komu and Pulkka.

== Culture ==
Kainuu Sámi were nomadic and lived by fishing and hunting forest reindeer. They did not practice reindeer herding. Their way of living was closest to the Forest Sámi. They did not know salt but seasoned their food with the ashes of birches and aspens.

As nomads, the Kainuu Sámi did not own land and some could have been too poor to pay taxes and were not marked in tax records. Those who could, paid their taxes from fishing and hunting. The Kainuu Sámi had a social status equal to the Finns, unlike the Sámi in Western Finland and Ostrobothnia who were in an inferior position to the landowners. They practiced Sámi shamanism.

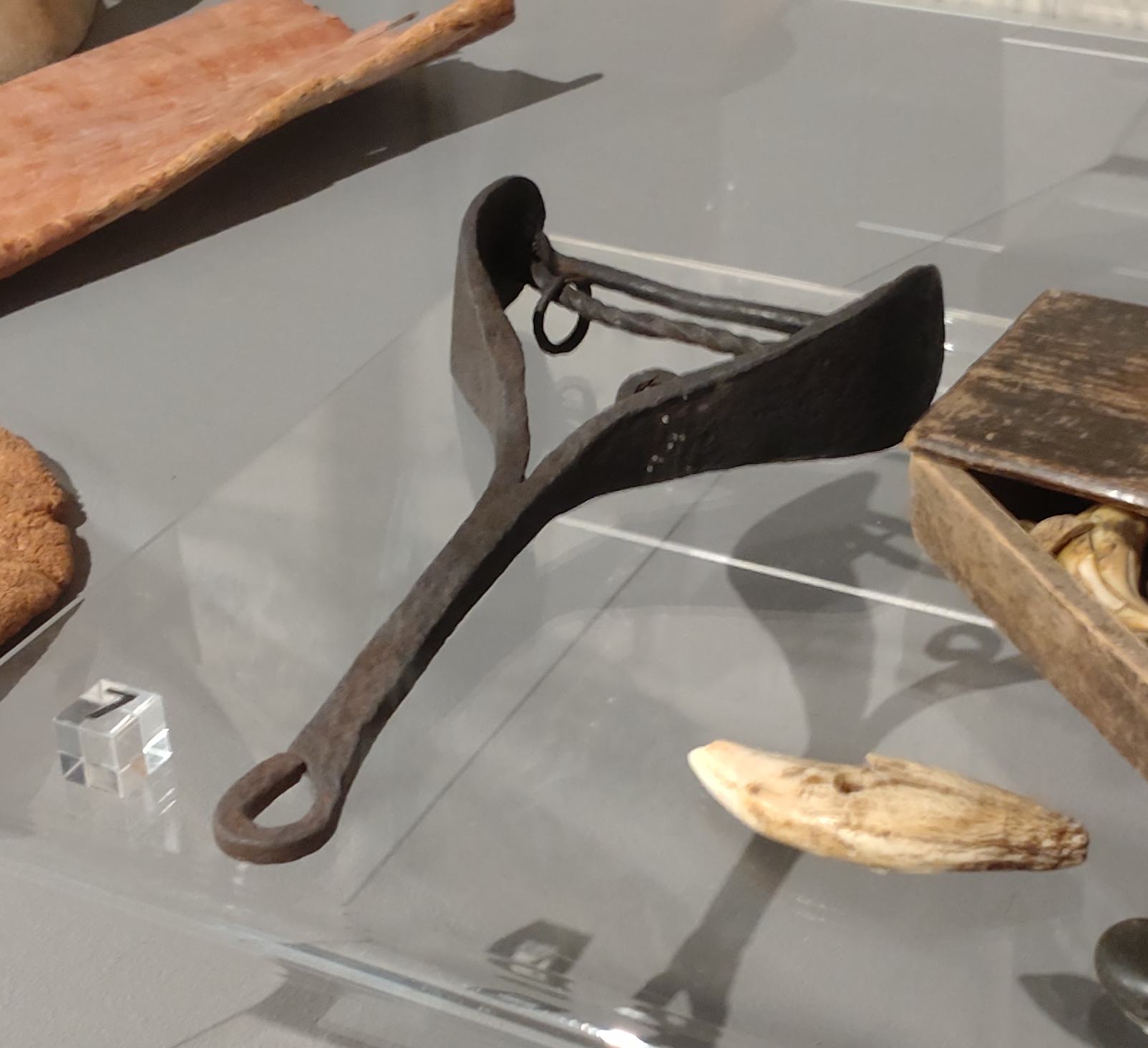
Iron Sámi shaman's drum hammer from Kuhmo, in Kainuu Museum.

There have been nearly zero archeological discoveries of items culturally linked to Sámi. The only discovered item is a shaman's drum hammer made of iron originating from Kuhmo, which is held in the Kainuu Museum. Most similar drum hammers were made out of bone and the only other iron drum hammer is held in a museum in Tromsø, Norway. Professor Ørnulv Vorren (1916–2007) from the Tromsø University Museum has thought that the iron drum hammer in Tromsø also originates from Kuhmo, as Kuhmo is known to have had a long tradition of iron forging and skilled smiths. In Finnic mythic oral tradition, iron forging is connected to a shaman's skills.

== Influence on Kainuu Finns ==
DNA research shows that most Kainuu Finnish families originate from South Savo. Savonians are shown to have been formed out of the mixing of Sámi and Tavastians, with sixth of their genes coming from Karelia. Kainuu genes show further mixing with Sámi.

There are place names of Sámi origin in Kainuu. Oral tradition knows some locations where the Kainuu Sámi could've lived or been buried to. Foundations of lavvus have been found. There is also some knowledge about Kainuu Sámi holy sites, such as in Ärjä island, and Vieksi in Kuhmo. The holy site in Ärjä continued to be used by Finnish hunters and fishers and was later named Porokirkko 'reindeer church'. The Sámi were considered powerful shamans and they left their mark in Kainuu incantations. As late as the 1880s, there was a strong belief in Kainuu that some people possessed shamanistic power called lapinmahti 'Lapp might'; the vicar of Paltamo, Antti Andelin, was thought to have possessed this power at the time. In 1917, Lassi Nevalainen from Kuusamo bragged in a runic song about his "Lappish family roots" which made him a powerful tietäjä. A folk story from Sotkamo describes the "Lapps" as being hospitable towards guests and strangers and speaking "a dialect of the same language as ours".

Two different Sámi superlative formations in Lakeland Sámi languages can be seen from place names in Kainuu and North Karelia. The name of lake Elimysjärvi in Kuhmo comes from Proto-Sámi *ëlē-mus 'uppermost', meaning 'Uppermost Lake'. The name of lake Ilomantsinjärvi in Ilomantsi, North Karelia, has the same meaning but from Proto-Sámi *ëlē-māńčë 'uppermost'. The Sámi word hoašša and the Kainuu dialect and White Sea Karelian word huosie both mean 'rough horsetail' and are the origins of the names of lake Hossanjärvi and lake Huosiusjärvi in Hossa, Suomussalmi. Other examples of place names of Sámi origin in Kainuu include Jämäs in Kuhmo (from Sámi jámeš 'deceased'), Kiekinkoski in Kuhmo (compare to Northern Sámi čiekčá 'osprey'), Koutaniemi in Kajaani (compare to Northern Sámi guovda- 'central'), Näljänkä in Suomussalmi (compare to Northern Sámi njealját 'fourth'), Puolanka (compare to Northern Sámi buollán 'burning land'), Uva in Ristijärvi (compare to Southern Sámi uvwe 'stream'), and Vieksi in Kuhmo (compare to Inari Sámi vieksâ 'strong'), among others.
