= Voknavolok =

Voknavolok Вокнаволок Vuokkiniemi (Karelian)
- Hamlet
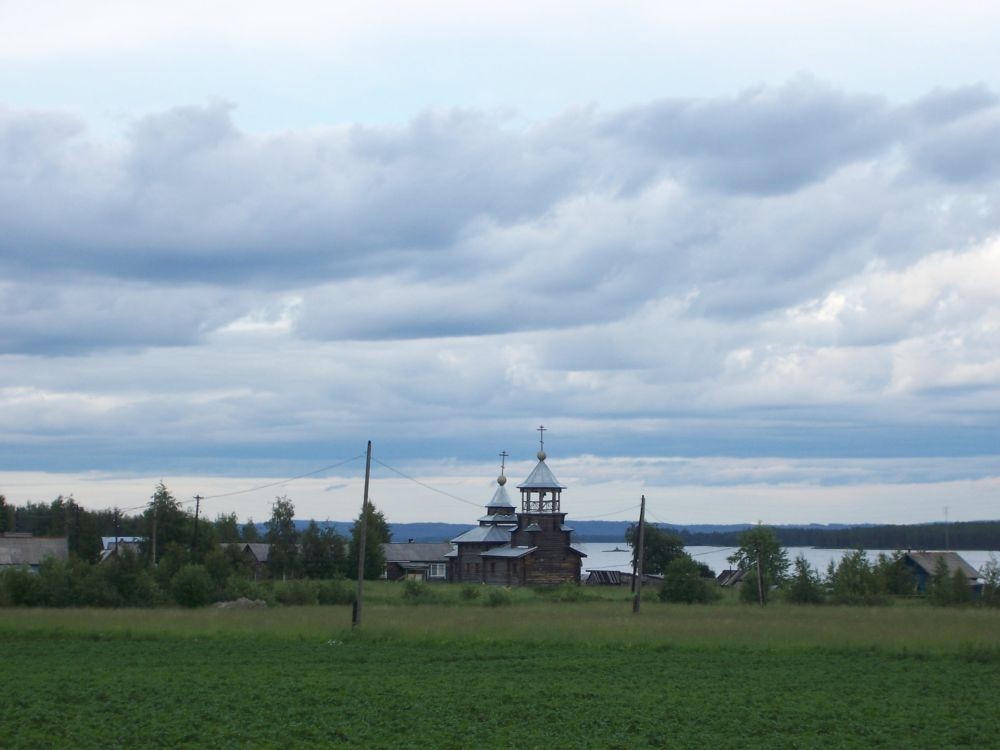
- Voknavolok
- Interactive map of Voknavolok
- Location of Voknavolok Voknavolok (Karelia)
- Coordinates: 64°57′6″N 30°33′12″E
- Country: Russia
- Federal subject: Republic of Karelia
- Founded: 17th century

Population (2010 Census)
  - Total: 427
  - Estimate (2021): 309 (−27.6%)

Municipal status
  - Urban okrug: Kostomukshsky Urban Okrug
- Time zone: UTC+3 (UTC+03:00)
- Postal code: 186942
- OKTMO ID: 86706000111

Voknavolok (Russian: Вокна́волок, Karelian: Vuokkiniemi) is a rural locality (selo) under the administrative jurisdiction of the town of Kostomuksha of the Republic of Karelia, Russia. Population: 427 (2010 census).

== History ==
=== 19th century ===
==== Demography and economy ====
The census of 1800 put the population of the parish of Vuokkiniemi at 853; by 1900, it stood at 3265. A large proportion of the population was, or was descended from, migrants from Finland: around 1890, 34% of the population descended from migrants from Ostrobothnia, 25% from Kainuu, and 18% from Finnish Karelia, while statistics from 1902 to 1908 show no evidence of people using Russian as their primary language or having Russian identity. The economy of the parish was a mixed subsistence economy of a kind found widely in subarctic Eurasia. This included livestock-rearing, local freshwater fishing, and hunting (until an 1892 ban on trapping). It featured slash-and-burn agriculture (though this was circumscribed to varying degrees by law) and agriculture in the co-operative mir-system, focused on barley, rye, potatoes and turnips. And it included wage-labour for fishing companies on the Arctic Sea; itinerant begging; and itinerant trading, especially west into Finland, primarily selling furs, netting thread, hemp, mutton, fish, butter and birds and purchasing flour and salt. A postal route between Vuokkiniemi and Suomussalmi commenced in 1898.

==== Religion ====
An Orthodox Christian chapel (tsasouna) had been built in Vuokkiniemi by the 1780s, at which time the parish gained independent status within the organised Church. A church was built in 1804. By 1881, chapels had been built in other villages in the same parish—Vuonninen, Venehjärvi, Kivijärvi, and Latvajärvi. However, official influence on the local religion was limited: it was common that there was no priest in the parish in the earlier nineteenth century, and even in the 1880s a priest might tour the surrounding chapels only twice a year. Official religion used the Russian language, which was the first language of few inhabitants. Many people in Vuokkiniemi thus belonged to various sects of the Old Believers. Their Christianity was deeply infused with originally non-Christian traditions, including a prominent role for the sages known as tietäjät. Laestadianism grew prominent around the 1890s.

==== Traditional poetry ====
In 1832, Elias Lönnroth estimated that less than one percent of Vuokkiniemi's peasants could read. Throughout the nineteenth century, however, they sustained a vigorous tradition of Karelian-language oral poetry, including epics, laments, and incantations (including the aetiological myths known as synnyt). Indeed, Vuokkiniemi and its surrounding villages and parishes became the celebrated centre of much collecting of Finnic-language folklore, which inspired the Kalevala and much of the Finnish and Karelian nationalist movements. In the century following the first written record of a poetic text from Vuokkiniemi, made by Zachris Topelius the Elder on 23 January 1821, inhabitants of Vuokkiniemi contributed at least 2960 folklore texts to the collections of the Finnish Literature Society, many later published in the voluminous Suomen kansan vanhat runot. Key collectors were Elias Lönnroth, Axel Borenius, Samuli Paulaharju, and Iivo Marttinen.
