= Kalmasaari =

Island in Finland and Russia

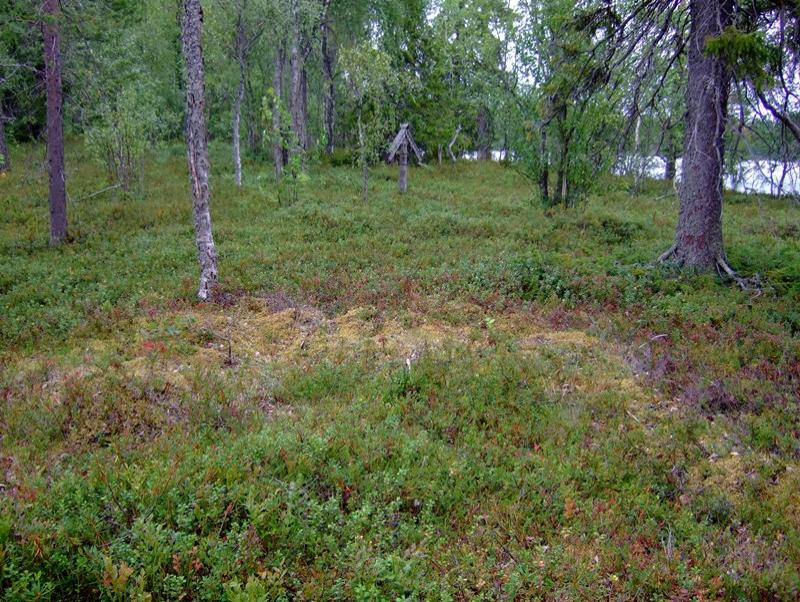
- Kalmasaari with a 1987 erected memorial cross on the background
- Interactive map of Kalmasaari

Geography
- Location: Vuokkijärvi
- Coordinates: 64.648996°N 30.135840°E
- Area: 0.0115 km^{2} (0.0044 sq mi)
- Length: 0.22 km (0.137 mi)
- Width: 0.08 km (0.05 mi)

Administration
- Finland
- Province: Kainuu
- Russia
- Federation subject: Republic of Karelia

Demographics
- Population: 0

Kalmasaari (lit. 'Death Island', also Kalmosaari, Russian: Раясаари) is an island in the lake Vuokkijärvi in Karelia. It is divided by the border between Russia and Finland. The island is located in the areas of Suomussalmi (Finland) and Kostomuksha (Russia). On both sides, it is part of the border zone and is off-limits to the general public.

Kalmasaari was used as a cemetery by the Eastern Orthodox villages of Kuivajärvi, Hietajärvi and Vuokinsalmi until 1922 when the Finland–Russia border was determined. A new cemetery was established to the Kalmisaari island of lake Kuivajärvi, 4 kilometres west of Kalmasaari.

The Russian name of Kalmasaari is ″Раясаари″, which is a transliterated version of Finnish word ″Rajasaari″ meaning ″Border Island″.
