= Northern Karelian dialect =

Dialect of the Karelian language

Northern Karelian
- North Karelian; White Sea Karelian; Viena Karelian
- Vienankarjala
- Native to: Russia and Finland
- Region: White Sea Karelia
- Language family: Uralic: Finnic; Northern Finnic; Karelian; Karelian Proper; Northern Karelian

Official status
- Recognised minority language in: Finland; Russia: Republic of Karelia

Language codes
- ISO 639-3: krl
- Glottolog: nort2673
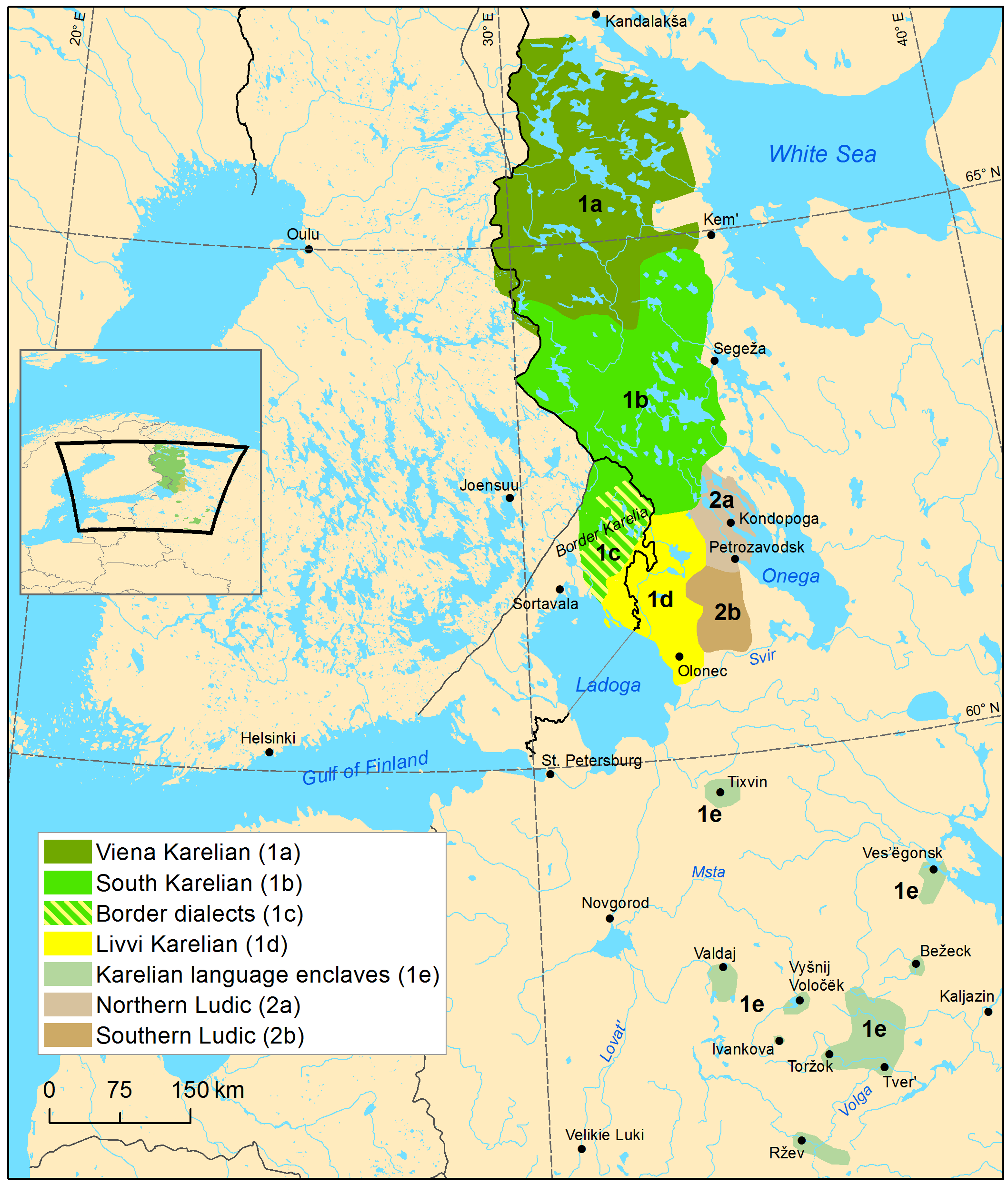
- Karelian Proper consists of 1a

Northern Karelian (also called: White Sea Karelian, Viena Karelian and North Karelian) (North Karelian: Vienankarjala) is one of the two dialects of Karelian Proper. Northern Karelian is spoken mainly in White Karelia, and is also the traditional language of the villages of Hietajärvi, Kuivajärvi and Rimpi in the Kainuu region of Finland. Northern Karelian is the most mutually intelligible Karelian dialect to speakers of the Finnish language.

Northern Karelian differs from South Karelian due to its inclusion of the voiceless consonants p, t, k, s and š. It also differs due to its more common usage of the š [sh/see] letter more than in other Karelian dialects.

== Location ==
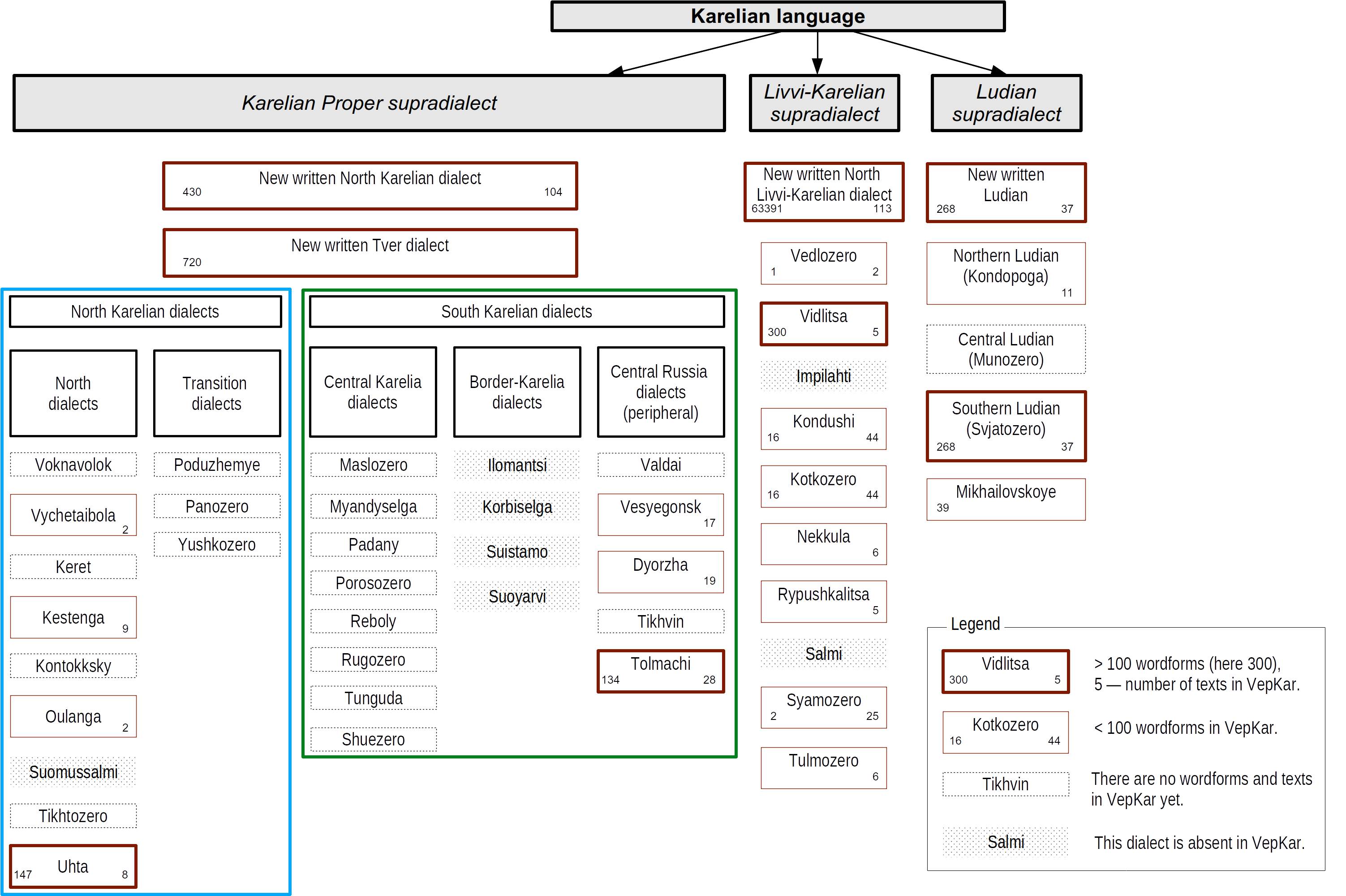
Dialects of the Karelian language according to Vepkar

Northern Karelian is spoken in the northernmost parts of the Republic of Karelia, which is called White Karelia and in the villages of Hietajärvi, Kuivajärvi and Rimpi in Kainuu. Specifically it is spoken in the parishes of Jyskyjärvi, Kieretti, Kiestinki, Kontokki, Oulanka, Paanajärvi, Pistojärvi, Suomussalmi, Uhtua, Usmana, Vitsataipale and Vuokkiniemi.

== Examples ==
The following example is from Petrozavodsk in 1995:

| North Karelian | Finnish | English |
|---|---|---|
| Ennein vanhah karjalaiset varattih riähkyä. | Ennen vanhaan karjalaiset varoivat tekemästä syntiä. | In the old days, Karelians were careful not to sin. |

Southern, Northern and Livvi dialects compared:

| Livvi | Southern | Northern | English |
|---|---|---|---|
| pakkaskuu | pakkaiskuu | pakkaiskuu | January |
| tuhukuu | tuuččakuu | tuiskukuu | February |
| kevätkuu | kevätkuu | kevätkuu | March |
| sulakuu | sulakuu | šulakuu | April |
