= Rimpi, Kuhmo =

Rimpi
- Village
- Location in Finland Rimpi (Finland)
- Coordinates: 64.512°N 29.932°E
- Country: Finland
- Region: Kainuu
- Sub-region: Kehys-Kainuu
- Municipality: Kuhmo
- Time zone: UTC+2 (EET)
  - Summer (DST): UTC+3 (EEST)

Rimpi or Rimminkylä is a small village in northeastern Kuhmo, Finland, near the border with Russia. While sometimes considered part of the larger village of Vartius, Rimpi is distinguished from it and the rest of Kuhmo by its traditionally Karelian-speaking Orthodox Christian population, being one of three Karelian settlements in the Kainuu region along with Kuivajärvi and Hietajärvi in neighboring Suomussalmi.

As of 2020, there were no permanent inhabitants in Rimpi.

== Geography ==
Rimpi comprises a few houses on the shore of lake Juortananjärvi and on the hills Huosiusvaara and Kiimavaara, near a road connecting Lentiira to the Vartius border crossing station. It has never officially (Note: Official villages (rekisterikylä, "land register villages") have not existed since 2014 and often did not correspond to local definitions of villages.) been a separate village from Vartius, but has been treated as one locally and is culturally distinct from Vartius proper and the rest of Kuhmo. Rimpi forms a nationally significant cultural heritage site along with Kuivajärvi and Hietajärvi in Suomussalmi, with all three villages traditionally being inhabited by Karelians.

The Kultalähde or Kultakaivo spring, located near the Vartius border crossing point, is a local cultural-historical site. It is mentioned in the 1789 work Mythologia Fennica as a spring whose waters discharge into both the Gulf of Bothnia and the White Sea. According to a local legend, a treasure will be granted to the one who eats a frog from the spring. The nearby section of the Russian border has remained unchanged since the 1595 Treaty of Teusina.

== History ==
Rimpi was settled around the 1850s by the Ahtonen and Huovinen families. The former were originally Lutherans from Kuhmo who had adopted Orthodoxy while living in Russian Karelia before returning, while the latter came from Kuivajärvi. According to oral tradition recorded by Pertti Virtaranta, the Ahtonen family came from Lauvuskylä in southern Kuhmo and left for Russia after crop failures caused by frost. Uljaska Ahtonen, who was six years old when his family had left, would eventually return to Kuhmo with his wife Outi and son Vasselei, settling on the hill Huosiusvaara. Around the same time, Ontrei Huovinen had bought the Rimpi farm. The two families later exchanged their farms with each other.

The first settlers of Kiimavaara are unknown. The hill was abandoned during the famine of 1866–1868 and its original inhabitants fled to the Svir area. It was later repopulated by families from Suomussalmi.

In 1890, Rimpi was visited by Akseli Gallen-Kallela, who would model Väinämöinen in his Aino triptych after Uljaska Ahtonen.

Until the Russian Revolution, the three Karelian villages in Kainuu were closely connected to those on the Russian side, with Rimpi being especially close to Babya Guba and other villages on the shores of Lake Kamennoye. Villagers were buried on an island of the lake until the border was closed in the 1920s. A new cemetery was established on the Lapinsärkkä cape in 1924. In 1920, the population of Rimpi was estimated to be 26.

Rimpi was destroyed during the Winter War, with only smaller buildings such as granaries remaining. Until then, the village had been distinguished from the rest of Kuhmo by its Karelian-style architecture, while post-war houses were built according to a standard plan. Some floor plans of the original houses have been preserved.

A highway, known as the "seventh Kekkonen road", was built through Rimpi near a waterway that had traditionally connected northeastern Kuhmo to Karelia in 1959. The road became more important in the 1970s as the Soviet town of Kostomuksha was being built, with many Finnish workers employed in its construction.

== Languages and dialects ==
The dialect of the Karelian language traditionally spoken in Rimpi is a Viena Karelian dialect. Karelian was still spoken by some villagers in the 1970s, with the local dialect being heavily influenced by the Kainuu dialect of Finnish.
