= Hietajärvi, Suomussalmi =

Hietajärvi Hietarvi
- Village
- Location in Finland Hietajärvi (Finland)
- Coordinates: 64.660°N 30.106°E
- Country: Finland
- Region: Kainuu
- Sub-region: Kehys-Kainuu
- Municipality: Suomussalmi
- Time zone: UTC+2 (EET)
  - Summer (DST): UTC+3 (EEST)

Hietajärvi (Karelian: Hietajärvi or Hietarvi) is a village in southeastern Suomussalmi, Finland, near the border with Russia. It is one of three villages in the Kainuu region with a traditionally Karelian-speaking, Orthodox Christian population, along with Kuivajärvi and Rimpi.

Hietajärvi was settled in the late 18th century. Before the Finnish–Russian border was closed in the 1920s, the three Karelian villages in Kainuu were closely connected to those in Russian Karelia. The village was destroyed during the Winter War and rebuilt afterwards.

== Geography ==
Hietajärvi is a small village of seven houses, five of which lie on a cape of the eponymous lake Hietajärvi. As of 2002, three houses in the village were inhabited. The village forms a nationally significant cultural heritage site along with Kuivajärvi and Rimpi, all of which are traditionally inhabited by Karelian Orthodox Christians.

The nearby island Kalmasaari in the lake Vuokkijärvi on the Finnish–Russian border has been a traditional burial ground of Hietajärvi and Kuivajärvi on the Finnish side and Vuokinsalmi on the Russian side, remaining in use until the border was closed in 1922.

== History ==
The first farm in Hietajärvi was established sometime in the late 18th century. It was held by Jyrki (Göran) Ahtonen, a former soldier of the Swedish army from Kuhmo. Local oral tradition suggests that Ahtonen was instead a Karelian named Aliipei, but available historical documents state that he was from Kuhmo. Some members of the Ahtonen family would later move to Karelia and adopt Orthodoxy, returning to Kuhmo in the 1850s, settling in what would later be known as Rimpi.

The Hietajärvi farm was eventually bought by Timo Huovinen from neighboring Kuivajärvi. The farm became wealthy under Huovinen, remaining so until a fire in 1864 followed by Timo's death in 1865. During the famine of 1866–1868, the Huovinen family fled for Russia, living in Pudozh until the end of the famine. The farm was later divided between Timo's sons.

Hietajärvi, like Kuivajärvi and Rimpi, was closely connected to nearby Karelian villages in Russia, such as Voknavolok and Babya Guba until the Russian Revolution. The villages had little contact with the rest of Finland until the closure of the Finnish–Russian border in the 1920s.

The population of Hietajärvi was evacuated to other parts of Finland during the Winter War, and in February 1940, the village was destroyed by the Finnish army. This was done to prevent Soviet soldiers from taking shelter in its buildings. Hietajärvi and Kuivajärvi were rebuilt after the war, but due to having to follow a standard plan, no houses were built in the traditional Karelian style. However, most houses were built on the lots of those that were destroyed, due to which the villages are more densely built compared to other villages in Kainuu.

Hietajärvi has never had services of its own, instead being dependent on those present in Kuivajärvi. A path connecting the two villages was expanded into a proper road in 1956. Hietajärvi has also been connected to Marjokylä via a path, which is now obstructed by a fence separating semi-domestic reindeer from wild Finnish forest reindeer.

== Languages and dialects ==
The dialect of the Karelian language traditionally spoken in Hietajärvi is a Viena Karelian dialect. Most people nowadays speak Finnish, specifically the Kainuu dialect. In 1961, linguist Pertti Virtaranta noted that only a few old people in Hietajärvi and Kuivajärvi still spoke Karelian. Some Karelian influence is still present in the local Finnish speech.
