= Rietrik Polén =

Finnish journalist and lecturer (1823–1884)

- Rietrikki Polén
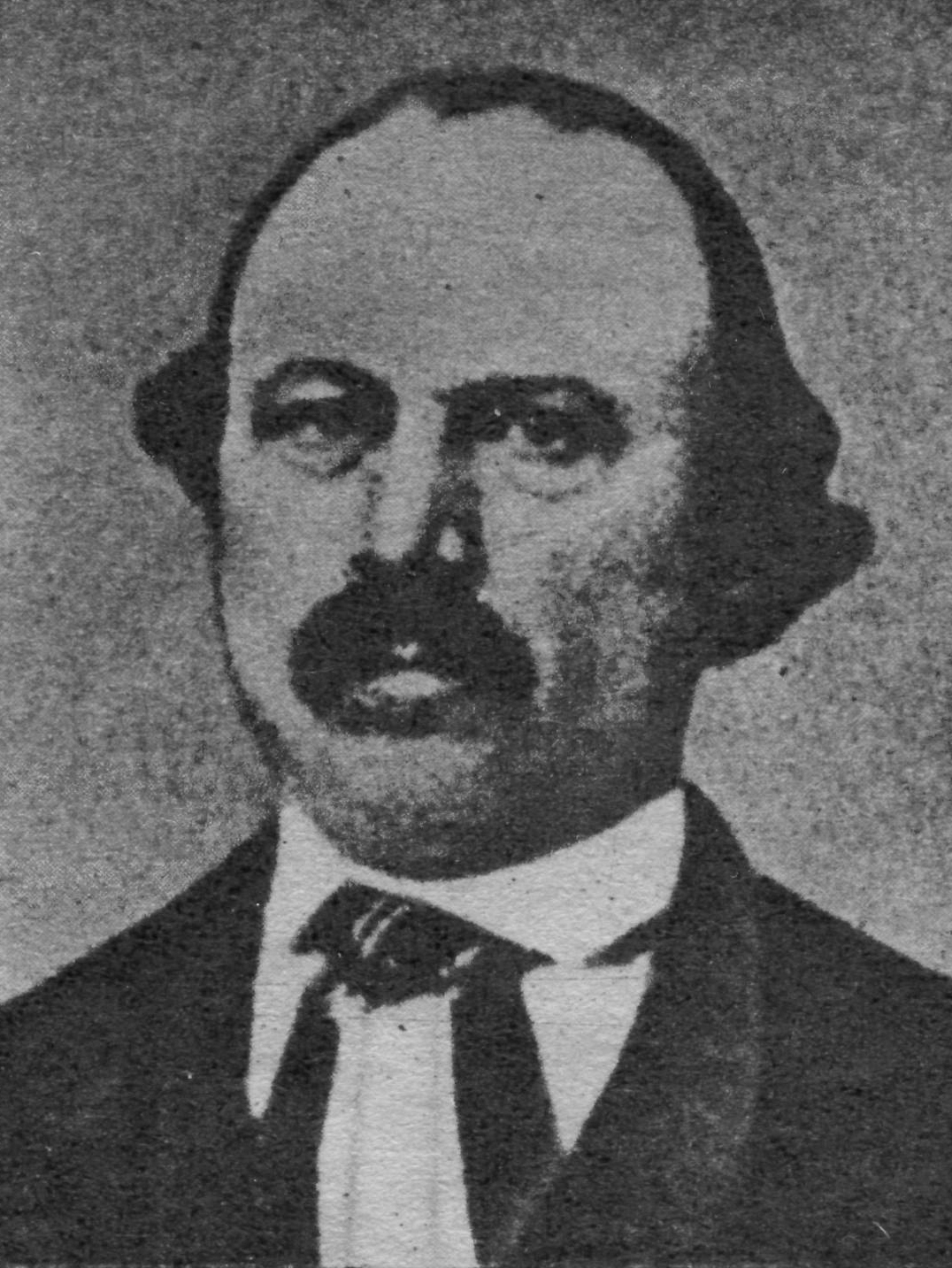
- Finnish author
- Born: 23 April 1823; Pieksämäki, Finland
- Died: 24 December 1884 (aged 61); Mikkeli, Finland
- Occupation: Journalist

Rietrik Polén (23 April 1823 – 24 December 1884, Finnish: Rietrikki Polén) was a Finnish journalist and lecturer. He was particularly noteworthy for his outspoken support of the Finnish nationalist movement in the mid-1800s.

== Biography ==
Rietrik was born to Fredrik Polénin and Severina Blidberg in 1823, graduated high school in 1845, then studied Ancient Languages, History, and Geography at the University of Helsinki where he earned a bachelor's and master's degree in 1850. As a student, he became interested in Hegelian ideas of national identity, leading to his involvement in Finnish nationalism. He was an active participant in the Finnish Literature Society, and did fieldwork in Eastern Finland gathering folktales, songs, and traditional magical spells. He earned his PhD in 1858 with his dissertation, Johdanto Suomen kirjallisuushistoriaan (Introduction to the History of Finnish Literature). In this work, he declared, "Our nationality and culture demand that in Finland, scientific work must be carried out in Finnish." To this end, his dissertation was the first ever submitted in that language. (At the time, most academic discussions were conducted in Swedish or Latin.)

Polén spent the rest of his life teaching Finnish literature and publishing Finnish language newspapers, including the financially unsuccessful Suomen Lehteä (Finland Magazine), Mehiläinen (The Honeybee), and Pellervo; he frequently contributed polemical articles to other newspapers as well. He also wrote a series of patriotic poems and essays, which were collected and published in Kirjallinen aarreaitta (The Treasure Trove). Polén died Christmas Eve, 1884. Interest in Polén has increased in recent years, and his nearly-forgotten tomb was renovated in 2004.

== Bibliography ==
- 1858. Johdanto Suomen kirjallisuushistoriaan (Introduction to the History of Finnish Literature) Doctoral Dissertation: University of Helsinki. Full text (in Finnish) at Project Gutenberg
- 1869. Kirjallinen aarreaitta (The Treasure Trove), Vyborg Literature Society:Vyborg
