= Finnic incantations =

Traditional form of medicine in the Finnic-speaking world

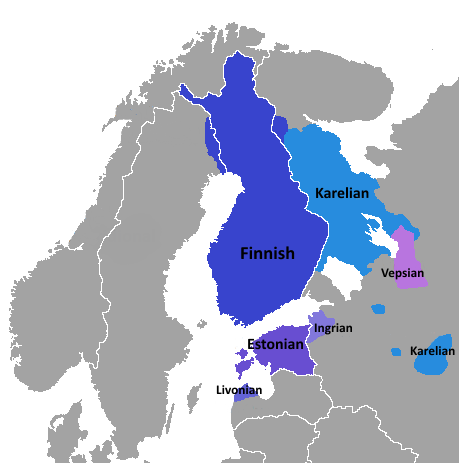
Map showing the distribution of the Finnic languages, approximating the area where Finnic incantations were found

Finnic incantations or charms (Finnish: loitsut, singular loitsu) are a body of traditional literature in the Finnic languages whose purpose was to effect magical change on the world. They were most often used to ward off diseases and injuries and to ensure economic prosperity in farming, hunting, fishing and cattle-raising, though spells were used in various social situations and everyday tasks. Such incantations were in widespread use from the first extensive documentation of Finnic-language cultures around the late eighteenth century through to the advance of modernisation in the early twentieth; one marker of this popularity is that more than 30,000 verse spells were collected from Finland and Karelia and published in the series Suomen kansan vanhat runot.

== Western Finland ==
In western Finland, as widely in European charm traditions, the utterance of an invocation was considered to work mechanically, with the charmer's main goal being to repeat the spell verses correctly. These traditions intimately combined Christian and traditional ideas. Spell motifs which are found in a full and archaic form in eastern Finland and Karelia appear in nineteenth-century Western Finland in an abbreviated form. These changes were partly due to the adoption in the west of poetic forms other than Kalevala-metre. As Kalevala-metre ceased to be a form for new compositions, the language and motifs associated with it ossified, encouraging the collapse of older charm traditions. The perceived practical usefulness of charms promoted their survival for longer than other genres, but texts became short, mixed with prose, and witnessed the collapse of traditional genre distinctions.

== North Karelia ==
Already by the beginning of the nineteenth century, Finnish folklorists noticed the vitality and distinctiveness of North Karelian incantations compared with Western Finnish ones. Unlike in western Finland, there was a strong tradition in this region that charm-texts were not effective in themselves, but specifically when performed by a specialist who exercised an inner power known as väki or luonto. The region was also distinctive for its interest in charms known as synnyt, which sought to exercise control over illnesses or similar forces by expounding their aetiologies; thus to cure a snakebite a charmer might sing the origin of the snake, to cure a burn they might sing the origin of fire, and so forth.

In the period 1816–1970, over 4,200 examples of spells were collected from North Karelia (of which over 3,400 have been published in Suomen Kansan Vanhat Runot). The most frequent purposes for incantations in this region were the healing and prevention of both external injuries and internal pains, infectious diseases, rashes and mental disorders (accounting for 1989 texts in the SKVR). Much of the collecting of charms took place against the backdrop of the 1866 Finnish typhus epidemic, though the most elaborate charms concerned external injuries, such as snakebites, burns, cuts, or debris that got into the eye or under the skin. Fewer economic spells—992—were collected; these relate to herding, fishing, hunting, and farming. Spells used in social interactions, such as wedding- and love-spells, account for a mere 253. Short spells used in various situations of everyday housekeeping also existed (183 examples). The seers known as tietäjät also had a tradition of incantations relating to their own healing rites (105 examples).

Key scholars who collected charms in the first half of the nineteenth century included Elias Lönnrot, Carl Axel Gottlund, D. E. D. Europaeus, August Ahlqvist, Rietrik Polén, Anders Johan Sjögren and Henrik August Reinholm, who generally focused on Ilomantsi, Pielisjärvi, Kesälahti and Kitee. Their successors in the second half of the century included Kaarle Krohn, Axel August Borenius, Oskar Relander, Antti Rytkönen and E. J. Hyvärinen, who expanded the collection area to the north and west of Pielinen. Around the beginning of the twentieth century, key researchers included Samuli Paulaharju, Oskar Lönnbohm, Jussi Lukkarinen, Uno Holmberg and Frans Kärki, who expanded their collecting to Juuka, Kontiolahti, Polvijärvi and Liperi.
