= Synty =

Mythological, Finnic concept

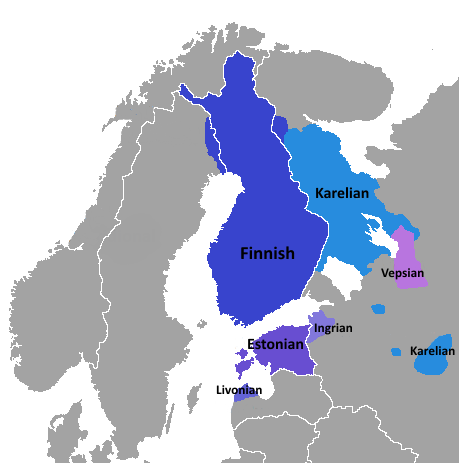
Map showing the distribution of the Finnic languages, approximating the area where the synty tradition was found.

Synty ('origin, birth, aetiology', pl. synnyt) is an important concept in Finnish mythology. Syntysanat ('origin-words') or syntyloitsut ('origin-charms') provide an explanatory, mythical account of the origin of a phenomenon (such as an illness), material (such as iron), or species (such as a bear), and were an important part of traditional Finno-Karelian culture, particularly in healing rituals. Although much in the Finnish traditional charms is paralleled elsewhere, 'the role of aetiological and cosmogonic myths' in Finnic tradition 'appears exceptional in Eurasia'. The major study remains that by Kaarle Krohn, published in 1917.

== Meanings of synty ==
The term synty is used in this article and in a range of scholarship as a genre-label, but it had a wide variety of meanings. Synty transparently derives from syntyä (‘come into existence, be born’) and means ‘birth’, ‘origin’, ‘aetiology’, and so forth. Its meanings can be literal and mundane (e.g. 'birth'), but it was also used in traditional poetry with a range of more numinous meanings, varying according to region, genre, and time. Thus in Kalevalaic poetry, synty can also denote the mystical power of a tietäjä (in which context it has been argued to refer to the origin of a tietäjä’s own powers and is more or less a synonym for the more frequent term luonto, perhaps being translated as 'fundamental essence'); it can be a synonym for 'god' or 'creator' (in the singular only, often in the collocation suuri synty, ‘great synty’); or it can denote other divine power whose source was more abstract.

In Karelian lament poetry, the plural synnyt and more especially its diminutive dialect form syntyiset (usually given in the Karelian form syndyzet) were important terms, found used of divine powers, the abode of the dead, the dead themselves, and even icons. It has been suggested that these usages are a loan-translation from Russian rod ('family') and roditeli ('parents'), which are used in similar ways and have an etymological connection with birth.

The term synty is used with varying degrees of specificity to denote poems within a wider body of Finnic incantations, a poem within which might also be referred to as a 'formulas', luku ('passage'), sanat ('words'), or virsi ('verse').

== Use of synty-poems ==
Knowing synnyt was a characteristic branch of knowledge for traditional healers, known as tietäjät. It was believed that knowing the origin of things made it possible to exercise control over them. Healing spells might, for example, include words like Kyllä tunnen syntymäsi ('indeed I know your origin').

It was long thought that synnyt were primarily recited as prefaces to charms much like a historiola, to make the charm itself more effective, perhaps as part of a process of diagnosis. More recent work, however, has suggested that, though often combined with other incantations, the synty element is in these cases usually central rather than preliminary, and not so much a diagnosis as a cure; their primary context of use seems instead to have been healing physical (as opposed to metaphysical) injuries and wounds where there was no illness agent (such as a witch) to conjure. Synnyt might also be used in, for example, hunting rituals.

There is some debate over in what contexts synnyt were recited and in what contexts they were sung (and whether it is meaningful to distinguish between these modes). It appears that synnyt were recited in Western Finland by the eighteenth century but might still have been sung in the seventeenth. There is some evidence for synnyt or similar genres being performed by pairs of singers in the manner of epic poems, but not much. The poems themselves, however, give singing a prominent role. The tradition of performing synnyt has been compared with the North Germanic tradition of galdr, where a clear distinction between singing and speaking may not be appropriate.

== Early evidence ==
The first 24 lines of the second earliest attestation of the magical poem Raudan synty, from Finnish National Archives, Varsinaisten asioiden pöytäkirjat 1657-1658 (KO a:10), f. 609r l. 22.

The synnyt mostly survive in nineteenth-century folklore collections. However, the earliest are attested in documents of the 1650s: the minutes of the parliament of Vaasa for 26 August 1657 record aetiological poems for iron and fire. On 30 June 1658, court records for Vaasa record an aetiological poem for a magical shot (pistos) and on 5 July the same year in Isokyrö for cancer, iron, and fire.

The earliest scholarly discussion of synnyt is in the fourth fascicule (published in 1778) of Henrik Gabriel Porthan's De poësi Fennica.

Synty next makes a significant appearance as a genre term in Christianus Erici Lencqvist's dissertation De superstitione veterum Fennorum theoretica et practica, published in 1782. Discussing the mythical figure Kaleva, Lencqvist mentioned Kaleva's sword, and noted that one mention of that appears ‘in his versibus ... quibus ortus serpentis mythice exponitur (Kärmen syndy)’ ('in these verses ... in which the origin of the serpent is mythically expounded (Kärmen synty)'), quoting the following lines with his Latin translation:

Mist’ on kieli keitolaisen?

Miekasta Kalewan pojan, h. e.

Whence is Keitolainen’s tongue?

From the sword of Kaleva’s boy, i. e.

Unde lingua coquinarii? (Serpentis, qui venenum in ore gignat et quasi coquat?)

E gladio Calevæ filii (h. e. formidolosissimo?).

Whence the tongue of cooking-boy? (Of the serpent, who produces venom in its mouth and, as it were, cooks it?)

From the sword of Kaleva's son (i. e. ‘from the most terrifying sword’?)

Soon after, Cristfried Ganander included an entry for synnyt in his Mythologia fennica, defining them thus: ‘Synnyt, Archæologier öfver elden, ormen, sten, alla trän; läses öfver skador och sår af vidskeplige' (‘Synnyt: ancient histories of fire, the snake, stone, all trees; spoken over injuries and wounds by the superstitious').

== Example ==
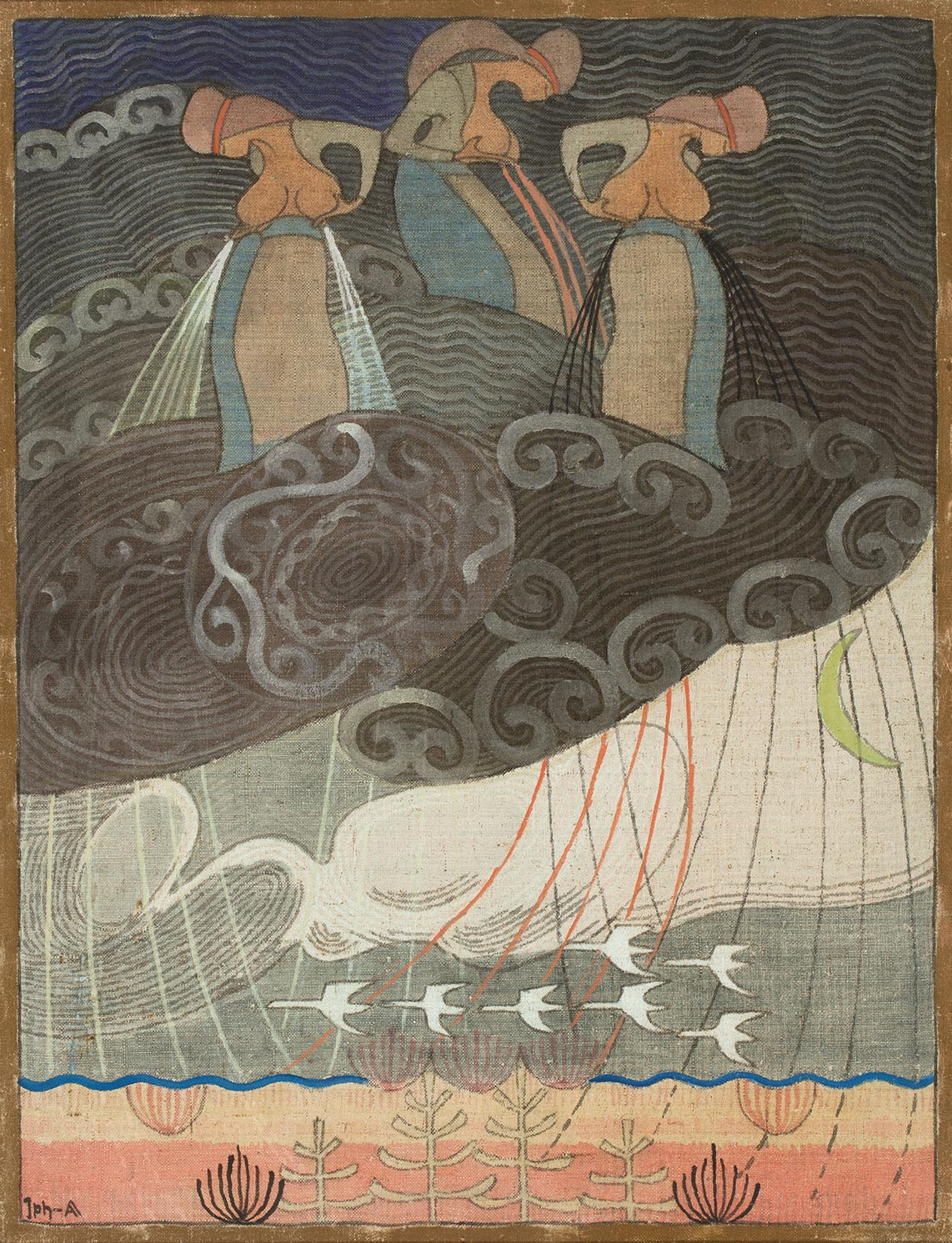
The Birth of Iron, Joseph Alanen, 1910–1912

The most widely attested subject for synnyt, according to the Suomen kansan vanhat runot, is the origin of iron. One example of such a synty, as edited by Lönnrot and translated by Abercromby, is:

Kyllä tieän rauan synnyn, Arvoan alun teräksen: Toisin ennen tuulet tuuli, Toisin ennen säät sävisi, Maata kuokki koivun latvat, Peltoja petäjän kerkät. Tuuli silloin kuusi vuotta, Seurui seitsemän keseä, Tuuli taittoi tammen latvat, Rutaisi ruhevat raiat, Maasta mättähän mäkäisi, Tuopa myöstihe merelle, Siitä saari siunautui Meren selvälle selälle, Saarelle salo sorea, Salohon sileä nurmi, Siihen kasvoi kaksi neittä, Koko kolme morsianta. Niinpä neiet astunevi Niitylle nimettömälle, Istuivat itähän rinnoin, Etelähän päin elivät, Lypsit maalle maitoansa, Niitylle nitusiansa. Läksi maiot vieremähän, Vieri soita, vieri maita, Vieri auhtoja ahoja, Vieri suolle mättähäsen, Metisehen mättähäsen, Kultaisehen turpehesen. Siitä syntyi rauta raukka, Siitä syntyi ja sikesi, Suon sisällä, maan navalla, Maalla keskikorkealla, Kasvoi rautaiset orahat, Miehen peukalon pituiset. Vaka vanha Väinämöinen, Tietäjä ijän ikuinen, Oli teitensä käviä, Matkojensa mitteliä, Löysi rautaiset orahat, Teräksiset touvon taimet, Katselevi, kääntelevi, Sanan virkkoi, noin nimesi: ‘Mitkä nää on toukojansa, Ja kutka orahiansa? Jotain noistaki tulisi, Luona taitavan takojan.’ Kokosi ne knottihinsa, Kantavi sepon kätehen; Tuop’ on seppo Ilmarinen; Etsivi pajan sijoa, Löysi maata pikkuruisen, Notkoa ani vähäisen, Johon painoi palkehensa, Johon ahjonsa asetti, Vaan ei kasva rauta raukka, Sukeu suku teräksen, Pajassa ovettomassa, Ahjolla tulettomalla; Puita puuttui pauan seppä, Tulta rautojen takoja. Saapi puita, tuopi tulta, Vaan ei vielä rauta synny, Kun ei liene lietsojata, Palkehella painajata. Otti orjan lietsomahan, Palkkalaisen painamahan, Katsoi ahjonsa alusta, Lietsimensä liepehiä, Jopa syntyi rauan synty, Sikesi suku teräksen.	Full well I know the iron's genesis, I remember the origin of steel. Of old the winds blew otherwise, of old storms whistled otherwise, the head of a birch tore up the ground, the young shoots of a fir the fields. Then it blew six years, seven summers it inflicted harm, the wind broke off the heads of oaks, smashed branching [v. huge] sallow trees, knocked a hillock from the ground and conveyed it to the sea; an isle was formed by spells from it on the clear and open sea on the island was a lovely wood, in the wood meadow smooth, on this two girls grew up, a triplet of brides. Well, the three maidens walked along to a meadow without a name, sat down with their breasts to the east, with their heads to the south, milked their milk upon the ground, their paps upon the mead. The milk began to flow, flowed over swamps, flowed over lands, flowed over sandy fields run wild, flowed to a hillock on a swamp, to a honeyed knoll, into golden turf. Hence did poor iron originate, then it was born and was produced, in a swamp, on an earthy knoll, on ground of medium height iron sprouts grew up as high as the thumb of a man. Trusty old Väinämöinen, the soothsayer old as time, was wending his way, was pursuing his course; he found the iron sprouts the growing shoots of steel, he looked about, turned round, uttered a speech and thus he spoke:-- What sort of growing corn is this and what these sprouting shoots? Something would result from them at a skilful hammerer's.' Into his pouch he gathered them, to a smith's hands he carried them. The smith Ilmarinen sought a place for his forge, found a tiny bit of ground, a very tiny dell where he put his bellows up, where he set up his forge, but wretched iron is not produced (F. grows not) and steel does not originate in a smithy without a door, in a forge without a fire; the blacksmith had lack of wood, the forger in iron—of fire. He got some wood and fire he fetched, but still iron is not made (F. born) unless there be a bellowsman, a man to press the bellows down. He took a servant to blow, a hireling to press them down, he looked underneath the forge, along the bellows' outer edge, iron was already made (F. born) and steel produced.

== Topics of recorded synnyt ==
The Suomen kansan vanhat runot editions list around 131 topics for synty texts, 114 of them categorised as syntyloitsut ('synty-charms'), in a total of around 6900 individual records. Its categorisation of charms is based on a F. A. Hästesko's 1918 study of the genre. The ten most popular subjects among the synnyt categorised in the SKVR as incantations (loitsut) are, in declining order, rauta ('iron', 862 examples), käärme ('snake', 714), tuli ('fire', 690), niukahdus ('sprain', 539), käärmeen purema ('snakebite', 290), pistos ('stabbing pain', 260), puu ('tree', 219), koi ('cancer', 180), voide ('ointment', 175), ähky ('colic', 137), riisi ('rickets', 135), läävämato (literally 'cowshed-snake', 125), and löyly ('sauna steam', 108).

Of the other categories of synnyt, the most important are those classified as epic texts, pre-eminently the maailma ('world', 455) and kantele (371). These overall patterns of popularity are consistent with the earliest attested synnyt, recorded in trial-records from Ostrobothnia in the 1650s (where the synty tradition had been lost by the nineteenth century): these are all on topics which were later in the top ten (cancer, stabbing pain, fire, and iron).

The following table lists all the SKVR topics of synnyt.

Editorial category	Subject	Number of variants in SKVR	SKVR categorisation
Ailahan synty		1	loitsut ➜ syntyloitsut
Ajettuman synty	swelling	1	loitsut ➜ syntyloitsut
Ammuksen synty	ammunition	33	loitsut ➜ syntyloitsut
Ampiaisen synty	wasp	20	loitsut ➜ syntyloitsut
Eläinten puremien historioloita	animal bites historioloita	7	loitsut ➜ syntyloitsut
Erilaisia syntyjä	various aetiologies	12	loitsut ➜ syntyloitsut
Etanan synty	snail	1	loitsut ➜ syntyloitsut
Hammastaudin synty	dental disease	42	loitsut ➜ syntyloitsut
Haukan synty	hawk	1	loitsut ➜ syntyloitsut
Herhiläisen tai mehiläisen synty	hornet or bee	10	loitsut ➜ syntyloitsut
Hevosen synty	horse	31	loitsut ➜ syntyloitsut
Hien synty	sweat	1	loitsut ➜ syntyloitsut
Hiiren synty	mouse	2	loitsut ➜ syntyloitsut
Hirven synty	moose	4	loitsut ➜ syntyloitsut
Hylkeen synty	seal	26	loitsut ➜ syntyloitsut
Hä'än synty	?smoke	1	loitsut ➜ syntyloitsut
Härän synty	ox	1	loitsut ➜ syntyloitsut
Ihmisen synty	human	20	loitsut ➜ syntyloitsut
Jään synty	ice	1	loitsut ➜ syntyloitsut
Kalman synty	death	7	loitsut ➜ syntyloitsut
Karhun synty	bear	94	loitsut ➜ syntyloitsut
Keihään synty	spear	3	loitsut ➜ syntyloitsut
Kipujen synty	pain	3	loitsut ➜ syntyloitsut
Kissan synty	cat	3	loitsut ➜ syntyloitsut
Kiven kasvamattomuuden historiola	historiola of the stone's lack of growth	1	loitsut ➜ syntyloitsut
Kiven synty	stone	38	loitsut ➜ syntyloitsut
Kohtauksen historiola	historiola of seizure	47	loitsut ➜ syntyloitsut
Kohtauksen synty	seizure	14	loitsut ➜ syntyloitsut
Koin historiola	historiola of cancer	180	loitsut ➜ syntyloitsut
Koin synty	cancer	9	loitsut ➜ syntyloitsut
Koiran synty	dog	62	loitsut ➜ syntyloitsut
Korpin synty	raven	16	loitsut ➜ syntyloitsut
Koskeman synty	an abscess or boil	3	loitsut ➜ syntyloitsut
Kurkkutaudin synty	throat disease	3	loitsut ➜ syntyloitsut
Kuvun synty	swelling on the neck	7	loitsut ➜ syntyloitsut
Kärpän synty	fly	2	loitsut ➜ syntyloitsut
Kärpäsen synty	fly	2	loitsut ➜ syntyloitsut
Käärmeen pureman historiola	historiola of snakebite	290	loitsut ➜ syntyloitsut
Käärmeen synty	serpent	714	loitsut ➜ syntyloitsut
Lampaan synty	sheep	1	loitsut ➜ syntyloitsut
Lehmän synty	cow	1	loitsut ➜ syntyloitsut
Leinin historiola	historiola of rheumatism	16	loitsut ➜ syntyloitsut
Leinin synty	rheumatism	1	loitsut ➜ syntyloitsut
Letyn synty	a kind of disease	1	loitsut ➜ syntyloitsut
Loukkauksen synty	insults	5	loitsut ➜ syntyloitsut
Läävämadon synty	cow-house snake	125	loitsut ➜ syntyloitsut
Löylyn synty	sauna steam	108	loitsut ➜ syntyloitsut
Maahisen synty	gnome/rash	22	loitsut ➜ syntyloitsut
Matajaisen synty	spavin or swelling in humans or horses, or the supernatural being responsible for it in Finnish folk healing tradition	1	loitsut ➜ syntyloitsut
Muurahaisen synty	ant	1	loitsut ➜ syntyloitsut
Naurismadon synty	turnip-worm	5	loitsut ➜ syntyloitsut
Niukahduksen historiola	sprain historiola	539	loitsut ➜ syntyloitsut
Noidan synty	witch	3	loitsut ➜ syntyloitsut
Noidannuolten synty	witch's arrows'	4	loitsut ➜ syntyloitsut
Nuotan synty	seine	8	loitsut ➜ syntyloitsut
Pahkan synty	gnarl	1	loitsut ➜ syntyloitsut
Painajaisen synty	nightmare	4	loitsut ➜ syntyloitsut
Paiseen synty	abscess	14	loitsut ➜ syntyloitsut
Pakkasen synty	frost	70	loitsut ➜ syntyloitsut
Paran synty	a being created to bring milk or butter to its creator	1	loitsut ➜ syntyloitsut
Pirtin synty	cottage's	6	loitsut ➜ syntyloitsut
Pirun synty	devil	1	loitsut ➜ syntyloitsut
Pistoksen synty	stitch or pleurisy	260	loitsut ➜ syntyloitsut
Poron synty	reindeer	5	loitsut ➜ syntyloitsut
Pukin synty	billygoat	1	loitsut ➜ syntyloitsut
Purun synty	sawdust	1	loitsut ➜ syntyloitsut
Puun synty	tree	219	loitsut ➜ syntyloitsut
Pyssyn synty	gun	5	loitsut ➜ syntyloitsut
Pässin synty	ram	2	loitsut ➜ syntyloitsut
Päästäisen synty	shrew	1	loitsut ➜ syntyloitsut
Raanin synty	cancer	34	loitsut ➜ syntyloitsut
Ranskan synty	leprosy	1	loitsut ➜ syntyloitsut
Raudan synty	iron	862	loitsut ➜ syntyloitsut
Riiden synty	rickets	135	loitsut ➜ syntyloitsut
Ruosteen synty	rust	4	loitsut ➜ syntyloitsut
Ruton synty	blight	11	loitsut ➜ syntyloitsut
Ruusun synty	erysipelas	3	loitsut ➜ syntyloitsut
Ruven synty	scab	27	loitsut ➜ syntyloitsut
Räähkän synty	a kind of disease	1	loitsut ➜ syntyloitsut
Sammakon synty	frog	29	loitsut ➜ syntyloitsut
Saunan synty	sauna	4	loitsut ➜ syntyloitsut
Sian synty	pig	10	loitsut ➜ syntyloitsut
Siikasen synty	chaff (in the eye)	11	loitsut ➜ syntyloitsut
Silmien synty	eyes	1	loitsut ➜ syntyloitsut
Sisiliskon synty	lizard	111	loitsut ➜ syntyloitsut
Suden synty	wolf	41	loitsut ➜ syntyloitsut
Suolan synty	salt	2	loitsut ➜ syntyloitsut
Syyhyn synty	scabies	3	loitsut ➜ syntyloitsut
Syöpäläisten synty	lice	1	loitsut ➜ syntyloitsut
Syövän synty	cancer	1	loitsut ➜ syntyloitsut
Tautien ja vammojen historiolta	diseases' and injuries' histories	38	loitsut ➜ syntyloitsut
Tautien synty	diseases	71	loitsut ➜ syntyloitsut
Tervan synty	tar	4	loitsut ➜ syntyloitsut
Tietäjän apurin synty	the tietäjä's helper	17	loitsut ➜ syntyloitsut
Tietäjän varusteiden synty	the tietäjä's equipment	1	loitsut ➜ syntyloitsut
Tulen synty	fire	690	loitsut ➜ syntyloitsut
Tuohen synty	birch bark	4	loitsut ➜ syntyloitsut
Tuohuksen synty	candle	2	loitsut ➜ syntyloitsut
Tuulen synty	wind	9	loitsut ➜ syntyloitsut
Tuuliaisen synty		16	loitsut ➜ syntyloitsut
Ukkosen synty	thunder	9	loitsut ➜ syntyloitsut
Vamman synty	injury	3	loitsut ➜ syntyloitsut
Vasken synty	brass	8	loitsut ➜ syntyloitsut
Vatsataudin synty	stomach disease	1	loitsut ➜ syntyloitsut
Veden synty	water	20	loitsut ➜ syntyloitsut
Veren synty	blood	1	loitsut ➜ syntyloitsut
Vesihiiden synty	water demon	1	loitsut ➜ syntyloitsut
Vesikauhun synty	rabies	2	loitsut ➜ syntyloitsut
Viljan synty	grain	1	loitsut ➜ syntyloitsut
Vilutaudin synty	cold disease	1	loitsut ➜ syntyloitsut
Vitun synty	vagina	24	loitsut ➜ syntyloitsut
Voiteen synty	ointment	175	loitsut ➜ syntyloitsut
Yskän synty	pneumonia	2	loitsut ➜ syntyloitsut
Ähkyn synty	colic	137	loitsut ➜ syntyloitsut
Kalojen synty täistä	fish	3	kertovat runot ➜ epiikka
Kanteleen synty	kantele	371	kertovat runot ➜ epiikka
Maailman syntyruno	the world	455	kertovat runot ➜ epiikka
Oluen synty	ale	14	kertovat runot ➜ epiikka
Tanssin synty	dance	4	kertovat runot ➜ epiikka
Tuohuksen synty	candle	2	kertovat runot ➜ epiikka
Viinan synty	alcoholic drink	2	kertovat runot ➜ epiikka
Väinämöisen syntymä	Väinämöinen	3	kertovat runot ➜ epiikka
Pyhäkosken nimen synty	the name of Pyhäkoski	1	kertovat runot ➜ proosakertomuksiin liittyvät säkeet
Saarten synty	islands	1	kertovat runot ➜ proosakertomuksiin liittyvät säkeet
Virren synty	hymn	2	lyriikka ➜ laulut laulusta
Tupakan synty	tobacco	11	häärunot ➜ ennen hitä ➜ kihlajaiset
Ei tuli kivettä synny		1	loitsut ➜ sananlaskusynnyt
Maa kiven kovaksi laati		9	loitsut ➜ sananlaskusynnyt
Tiijän tiaisen synnyn		7	loitsut ➜ sananlaskusynnyt
Vesi vanhin veljeksistä	water, the oldest of brothers	206	loitsut ➜ sananlaskusynnyt
Vuoresta veden synty	water from a mountain	65	loitsut ➜ sananlaskusynnyt

Elias Lönnrot's 1880 edition selects synnyt on the following fifty-one topics:

Lönnrot number	subtypes	Abercromby number	Lönnrot title	Abercromby title
1		183	Ampiaisen synty	Wasps
2		184	Etanan synty	Snails
3	a–g	185	Hammasmadon synty	Tooth-worm
4		186	Hauvin synty	Pike
5		187	Hevosen synty	Horse
6		188	Hirven synty	Elk
7		189	Horkan synty	Ague
8		190	Hylkeen synty	Seal
9		191	Ihmisen synty	Man
10		192	Kaalimadon synty	Cabbage worm
11	a–c	193	Karhun synty	Bear
12		194	Keräjäin synty	Courts of law (folk-moots)
13		195	Kissan synty	Cat
14	a–b	196	Kiven synty	Stone
15		197	Koin synty	Cancer (whitlow)
16	a–b	198	Koiran synty	Dog
17		199	Koivun synty	Birch
18	a–b	200	Korpin synty	Raven
19		201	Kuvun synty	Swelling on the neck
20	a–b	202	Kyykäärmeen synty	Viper
21	a–g	203	Käärmeen synty	Snake
22	a–c	204	Liinan synty	Flax
23	a–f	205	Läävämadon synty	Cow-house snake
24	a–b	206	Maahisen synty	Earth elf (skin eruption)
25	a–b	207	Noidan synty	Sorcerer
26	a–b	208	Nuolien synty	Arrows
27	a–b	209	Oluen synty	Ale
28	a–c	210	Pakkasen synty	Sharp frost
29	a–d	211	Pistoksen synty	Stitch or pleurisy
30	a–i	212	Puiden synty	Trees
31		213	Raanin synty	Cancer
32	a–f	214	Raudan synty	Iron
33		215	Riiden synty	Rickets, atrophy
34	a–e	216	Rikkeitten synty	Injuries caused by spells
35		217	Ruosteen synty	Rust in corn
36		218	Rupien synty	Scab
37		219	Sian synty	Pig
38		220	Siikasen synty	Particles of chaff in the eye
39	a–e	221	Sisiliskon synty	Lizard
40	a–c	222	Suden synty	Wolf
41		223	Suolan synty	Salt
42	a–e	224	Tammen synty	Oak
43		225	Tijasen synty	Titmouse
44	a–f	226	Tulen synty	Fire
45	a–b	227	Vasken synty	Copper
46	a–d	228	Veden synty	Water
47		229	Veneen synty	Boat
48	a–c	230	Verkon synty	Net
49		231	Viinan synty	Brandy
50	a–g	232	Voiteen synty	Salves
51	a–c	233	Ähkyn synty	Gripes (colic, constipation)

== Literary adaptations ==
Literary adaptations of the synnyt appear in the Kalevala, for example the origin of oak and arrows in Runo II, flax in Runo IV, iron in Runo IX (an account which influenced oral tradition in turn), and the serpent in Runo XXVI.

== Editions and translations ==
The first substantial, scholarly collection of synty poems was Suomen kansan muinaisia loitsurunoja, ed. by Elias Lönnrot (Helsinki: Suomen Kirjallisuuden Seura, 1880), http://www.gutenberg.org/ebooks/48751. A very large part of this was translated into English by John Abercromby, The pre- and proto-historic Finns, both Eastern and Western: with the magic songs of the west Finns, Grimm Library, 9-10, 2 vols (London: Nutt, 1898), vol. 1, vol. 1, vol. 2, vol. 2. Lönnrot adapted his sources extensively, however, such that this edition should be viewed, like the Kalevala, more as a literary work by Lönnrot than as a direct representation of oral traditions.

Further texts, closely representing the field records of folklore collectors, were published in the Suomen kansan vanhat runot series.
