= Kainuu Sámi =

Extinct Sámi language of Finland

- Native to: Finland
- Region: Kainuu
- Ethnicity: Kainuu Sámi people
- Extinct: by 1800s
- Language family: Uralic: Sámi; Eastern; Mainland; Kemi Sámi?; Kainuu Sámi

Language codes
- ISO 639-3: None (mis)
- Glottolog: kain1277

Kainuu Sámi is an extinct Sámi language that was once spoken in Kainuu. It became extinct in the 18th century when the Kainuu Sámi began assimilating to the culture of the growing Finnish population. Kainuu Sámi belonged to the Eastern Sámi language group.

In his review of Jaakko Anhava's book Maailman kielet ja kielikunnat ("Languages and language groups of the world", 1998), researcher of Finno-Ugric languages Tapani Salminen stated that the idea of the existence of a Kainuu Sámi language that is separate from Kemi Sámi is not well reasoned.

The original inhabitants of Kainuu were Sámi hunter-fishers. In the 17th century, the Governor General of Finland Per Brahe fostered the population growth of Kainuu by giving a ten-year tax exemption to settlers. It was considered necessary at the time by Finnish authorities to populate Kainuu with Finnish farmers because control over the area was threatened from the east by Russians. Those who settled in Kainuu were mainly from Savonia.
