= Frans Kärki =

Finnish Lutheran pastor and politician (1884–1965)

Frans Johannes Kärki (11 February 1884 – 4 February 1965) was a Finnish Lutheran pastor and politician, born in Vesilahti. He was a member of the Parliament of Finland from 1919 to 1927, representing the Agrarian League. He was the father of Toivo Kärki.
