= Tietäjä =

Figure in traditional Finnic culture

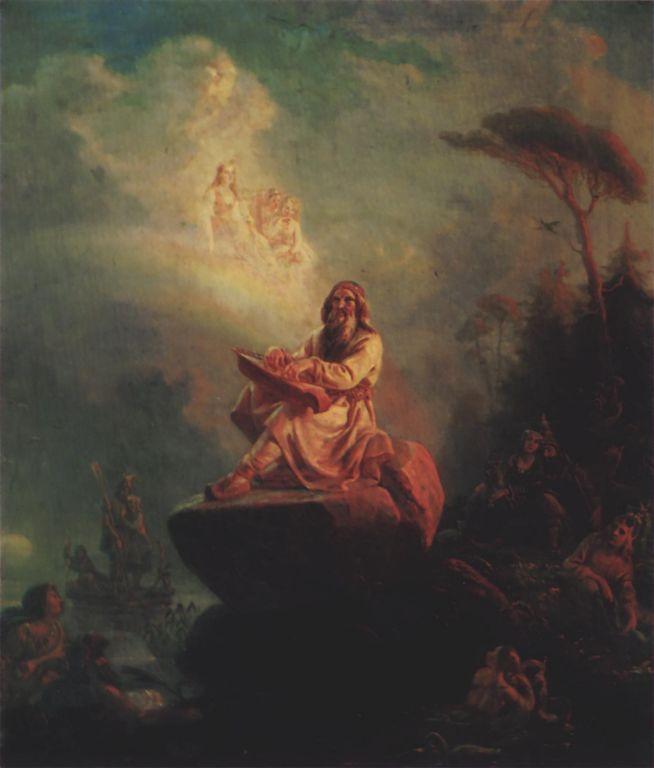
Depiction of the mythical tietäjä Väinämöinen by R. W. Ekman from 1866.

Tietäjä (Finnish pronunciation: [ˈtie̯tæjæ], pl. tietäjät, 'seer', 'wise man', literally 'knower') is a magically powerful figure in traditional Finnic culture, whose supernatural powers arise from his great knowledge.

== Roles ==
The activities of a tietäjä were primarily healing and preventing illness, but also included helping with farming, fishing and hunting; dealing with witchcraft; supporting approved marriages and disrupting disapproved liaisons; identifying thieves; and bringing success to ventures such as journeys or building. Their incantations might call on helpers such as the dead, väki, Ukko, Jesus Christ, the Virgin Mary, or animal spirits.

Many tietäjät knew Kalevala-metre poems, as well as mythical stories, spells, and healing charms. One of the key branches of the tietäjä's knowledge concerned aetiologies (synnyt, s. synty) of natural phenomena. It was believed that beings and phenomena could be controlled if their origin was known. For example, disease could be overcome if one recited or sang its synty. This knowledge was closely guarded. Tietäjät, sorcerers and healers were seen as protectors of a kind of cosmic equilibrium. Different kinds of beings had their own place in the universe, and if beings found themselves out of place, problems arose. The healer's role was often to return the beings to the right place. A sage generally knew the different requirements for different spells, in which often one needed to do rituals and recite spells, often also use magical substances or magic items. Their practices have often been compared with shamanism.

== History ==
The tietäjä is first recorded in Gabriel Maxenius's 1733 De effectibus fascino naturalibus. People known as tietäjät existed in real life, though the institution is now 'nearly extinct'. Traditions of Kalevalaic poetry, and the associated institution of the tietäjä, were aggressively opposed in Lutheran early modern Sweden (which included modern Finland), but became integrated into Russian Orthodox culture in Karelia and Ingria, partly assimilating to and partly thriving alongside Christian culture. Remnants of the tietäjä tradition also persisted among the Forest Finns as late as the twentieth century.

The history of the institution before the eighteenth century is obscure. The current scholarly consensus, based on comparative anthropological and linguistic evidence, is that Finnic-speaking cultures once shared in a wider central and northern Eurasian tradition of shamanism, most distinctively characterised by ritual specialists being believed to leave their bodies in spirit form. Such people were, in the Proto-Uralic language, probably denoted with the word *nojta (cf. Finnish noita 'witch' and Sámi noaidi). However, while tietäjä traditions clearly have important characteristics in common with shamanism, tietäjät were not believed to leave their bodies; their supernatural power arose rather from their command of memorised incantations and rituals. It is thought that these aspects of the tradition, and so the institution of the tietäjä as we know it, arose from contact with Germanic-speaking cultures, which exerted huge linguistic influence on Proto-Finnic language, and on other aspects of Finnic culture, in the first millennia BCE and CE. This is not to say that the tietäjä-institution was identical to its Germanic models, nor that it did not then change over time. Further influences, for example, came from later contact with Christianity.

== Appearances in myth and literature ==
Tietäjät also appear in Finnish mythology, the most famous mythological tietäjä being Väinämöinen, 'the mythic founder of the institution', who 'provided an identity model for its practitioners'. In Kalevalaic poetry, he is routinely referred to using the formulaic epithets vaka vanha Väinämöinen, | tietäjä iän ikuinen ('trusty old Väinämöinen, | the soothsayer old as time').

Tietäjät have been extensively studied in recent years by Anna-Leena Siikala and Laura Stark.

== See also ==
- Noaidi
