= Näljänkä =

- Village
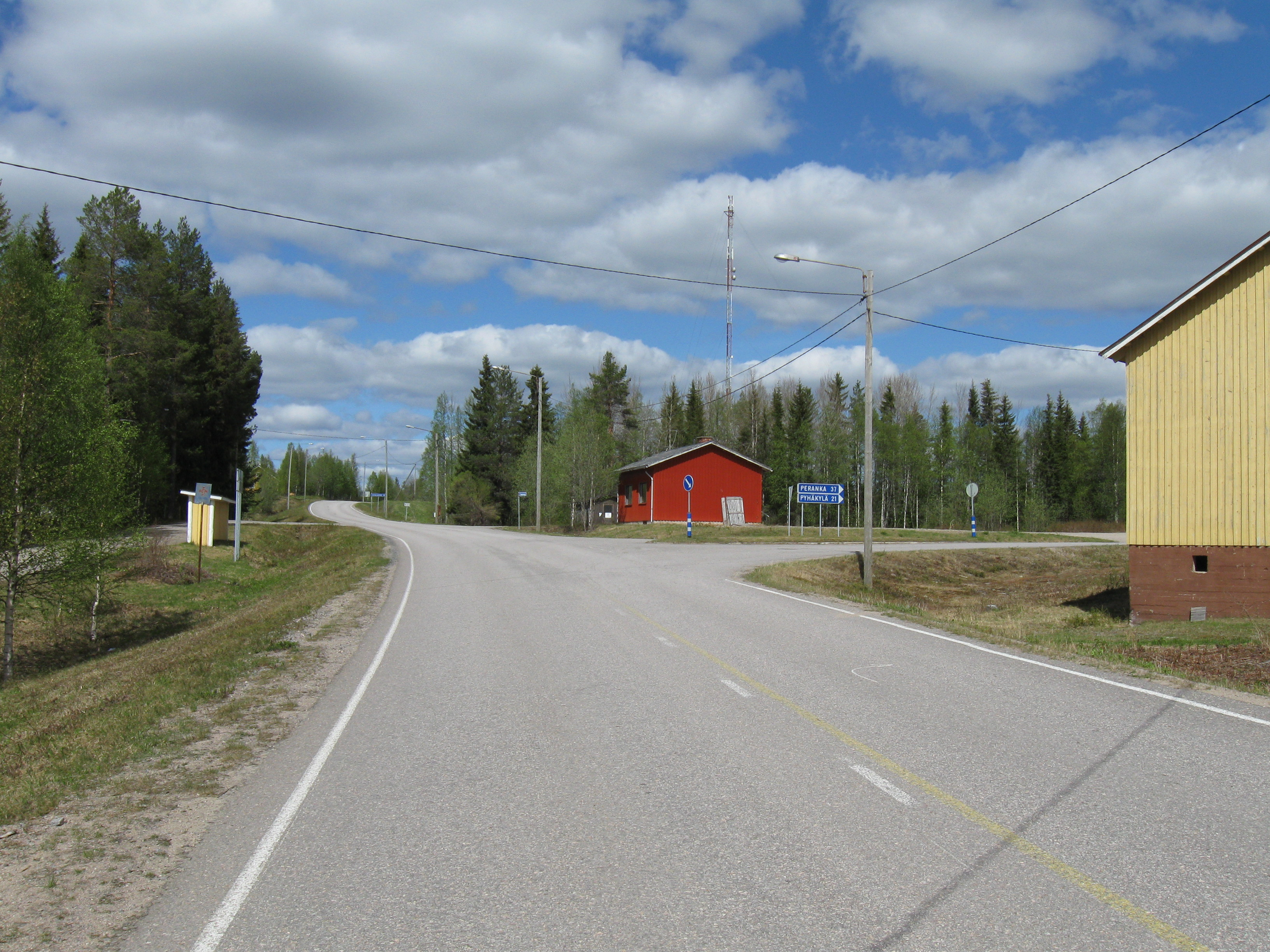
- Näljänkä village

- Location in Finland
- Coordinates: 65°13′31.81″N 28°24′58.13″E
- Country: Finland
- Region: Kainuu
- Municipality: Suomussalmi
- Time zone: UTC+2 (EET)
  - Summer (DST): UTC+3 (EEST)
- Postal code: 89670

Näljänkä (Finnish pronunciation: [ˈnæljæŋkæ]) is a small village in the Suomussalmi municipality in Kainuu, Finland. It is located about 50 kilometres (31 mi) north of the municipal centre, Ämmänsaari, and its most important road connection is regional road 800 between Ylivieska and Taivalkoski, which runs through the village.

The name of the village is of Sámi origin, which means 'fourth'. In this case, this ordinal number can mean either Lake Näljänkä (Näljänkäjärvi), which is the fourth lake in its watershed from the main lake, or the four swamps surrounding the village.

The village has its own church, Näljänkä Church, which was completed in 1981; in April 2020, Suomussalmi parish put the church building up for sale. There have been three former schools in the village, which have now been closed down: Leinola school founded in 1925, Niva school founded in 1927 and Kurkikylä folk school founded in 1945. One of the transportation points of the defunct Taivalkoski line, the Leino railway station, was located 8 kilometres (5.0 mi) east of the village.

== Sources ==
=== Further reading ===
- Manninen, Turo (2006). Kylä vedenjakajalla : Näljänkä ja näljänkäläiset (in Finnish). Näljänkä-seura. ISBN 952-92-0574-0.
- Manninen, Turo (2007). Näljänkä kuvina (in Finnish). Näljänkä-seura. ISBN 978-952-92-2600-9.
- Manninen, Erkki (2014). Näljänkä – Polkuja uuteen aikaan (in Finnish). Näljänkä-seura. ISBN 978-952-93-4720-9.
