= Gabriel Maxenius =

Gabriel Maxenius was born about 1710 in Lohja, probably to freeholders in the village of Maksjoki. He became a student at Turku Cathedral School on 21 February 1723, graduating on 19 June 1729, and matriculated as an undergraduate in Turku in 1729. He was tutor to the family of the priest Henrik Argillander in Kuopio in 1730. While there, he wrote the short text De effectibus fascino naturalibus, about traditional magical customs and rituals in the Kuopio region, providing some of the first evidence for these phenomena in Finland. He developed this material as a doctoral thesis, and was examined on 12 August 1733 by Johan Thorwöste. He was consecrated as a priest in the Diocese of Porvoo on 25 April 1734, and was assistant to the vicar in Helsinki in the same year. He was choirmaster of the grammar school there. He was elected vicar of Mäntsälä in 1741. Still unmarried, at least as of 1743, he held a sinecure in the diocese of Turku in 1749.
