= Suomen kansan vanhat runot =

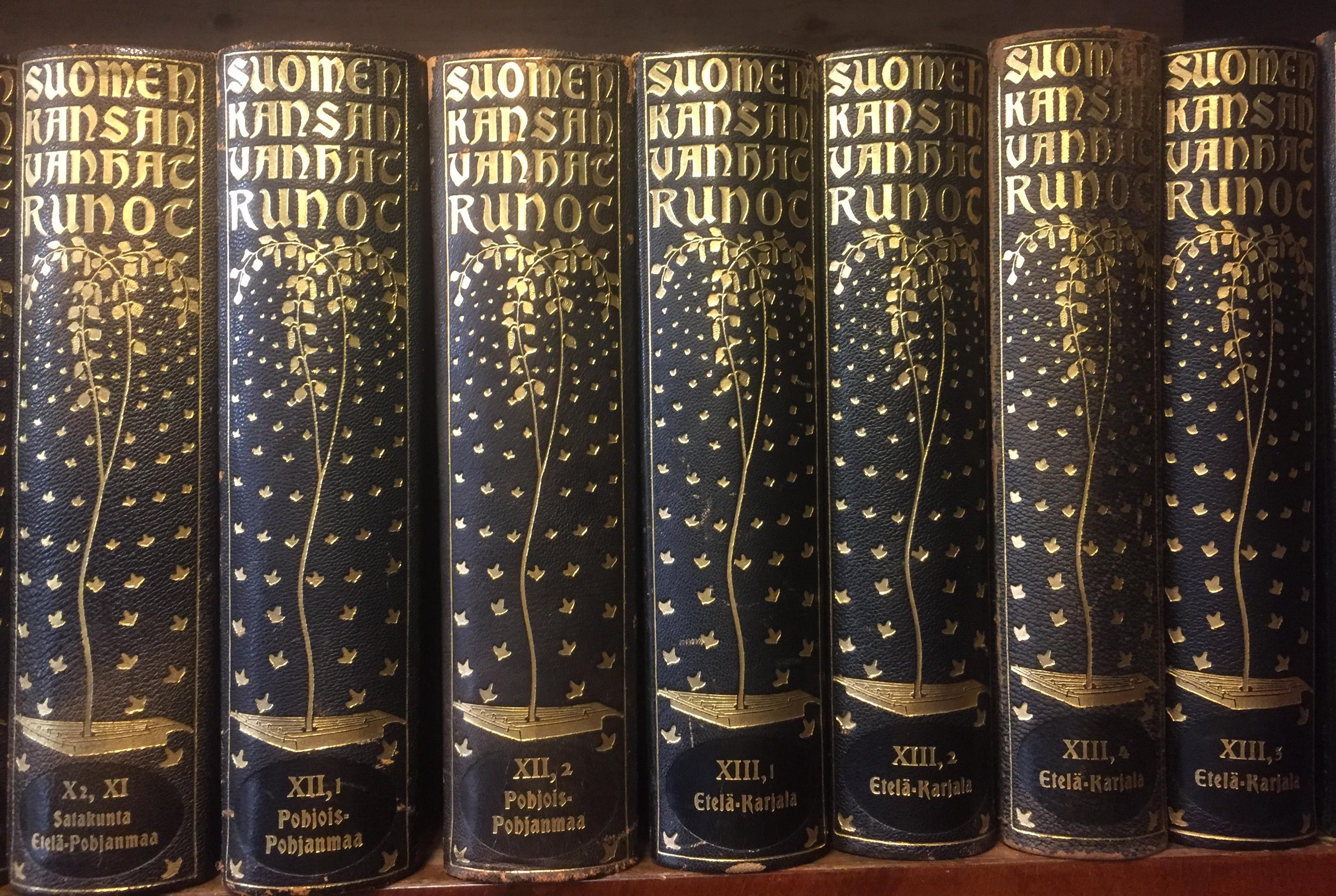
Suomen kansan vanhat runot vols X-2 to XIII-4 on shelf 247 of the north reading room of the National Library of Finland.

Suomen kansan vanhat runot (The Ancient Songs of the Finnish People), or SKVR, is an edition of traditional Finnic-language verse containing around 100,000 different songs, and including the majority of the songs that were the sources of the Finnish epic Kalevala and related poetry. The collection is available, free, online.

== Contents ==
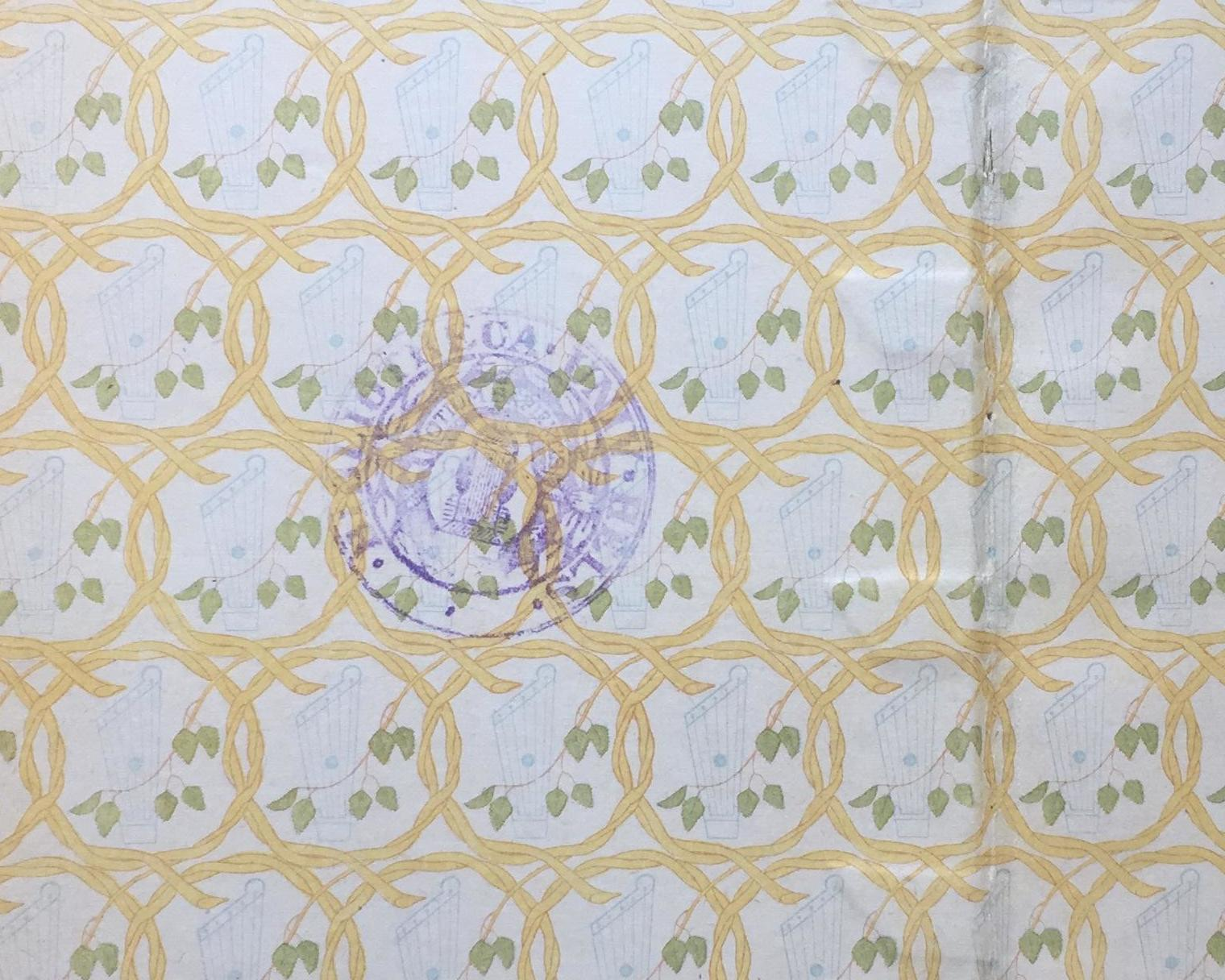
Inside front cover and recto of flyleaf of volume I.1 of Suomen kansan vanhat runot, showing kantele motif.

The original fourteen volumes (published in around 32 physical volumes) were published by the Finnish Literature Society from 1908 to 1948. A supplement, containing, among other things, some of the field notes of Cristfried Ganander and Elias Lönnrot, was added in 1997. The supplement also contains poems on highly sexual subjects, such as spells to obtain a sexual partner or to improve sexual performance, which had previously been considered unsuitable for publication. Most of the songs in the collection come from the archives of the Finnish Literature Society, but many come from elsewhere, including archives in other countries.

SKVR includes over 89,000 poetic texts in Kalevala-meter, though it is also rich in prose stories and other poetic forms. It does not include all Finnish folklore; around 60,000 texts, for example, are held in unpublished form by the Finnish Literature Society.

The songs in SKVR are organised into fourteen regions from which they were collected; most volumes then arrange the material by geographical location within the region, and then into four genres:

- lyric songs
- epic or narrative songs
- occasional songs (in genres such as wedding songs or lullabies)
- incantations.

Each of these genres is further divided into several subgroups. For example, in 1918 F. A. Hästesko published a sub-genre classification for incantations, which was used in SKVR.

The regions covered are as follows:

SVKR series number	number of parts	Suomalainen kirjallisuuden seuran toimitusksia series number(s)	editor	publication years	region
I	4	121	A. R. Niemi	1908–21	White Karelia
II	1	144	A. R. Niemi	1927	Olonets, Tver, and Novgorod Karelia
III	3	139	Väinö Salminen and V. Alava	1915–24	Western Ingria
IV	3	140	Väinö Salminen	1925–28	Central Ingria
V	3	141	Väinö Salminen	1929–31	Eastern and Northern Ingria
VI	2	142	J. Lukkarinen	1934–36	Savonia
VII	5	143	A. R. Niemi, Kaarle Krohn and V. Alava	1929–33	Border and North Karelia
VIII	1	145	Y. H. Toivonen	1932	Finland Proper
IX	4	146 (first publ. Monumenta Tavastica – Hämeen muistomerkkejä 1–2)	Hämäläis-Osakunta	1917–18 (first publ. 1915–17)	Tavastia
X	2	147	T. Pohjankanervo and J. Lukkarinen	1933–34	Satakunta
XI	1	148	J. Lukkarinen	1933	South Ostrobothnia
XII	2	149	Martti Haavio	1934–35	North Ostrobothnia
XIII	4	150	Väinö Salminen	1936–45	South Karelia
XIV	1	151	Väinö Salminen	1948	Uusimaa
XV	1	685	Matti Kuusi and Senni Timonen	1997	various

== English translation ==
A selection of poems is presented in normalised Finnish and in English translation in Finnish Folk Poetry: Epic. An Anthology in Finnish and English, edited and translated by Matti Kuusi, Keith Bosley and Michael Branch (Suomalaisen Kirjallisuuden Seuran toimituksia, 329, Helsinki: Finnish Literature Society, 1977).
