= Suomussalmi =

- Municipality
- Suomussalmen kunta Suomussalmi kommun
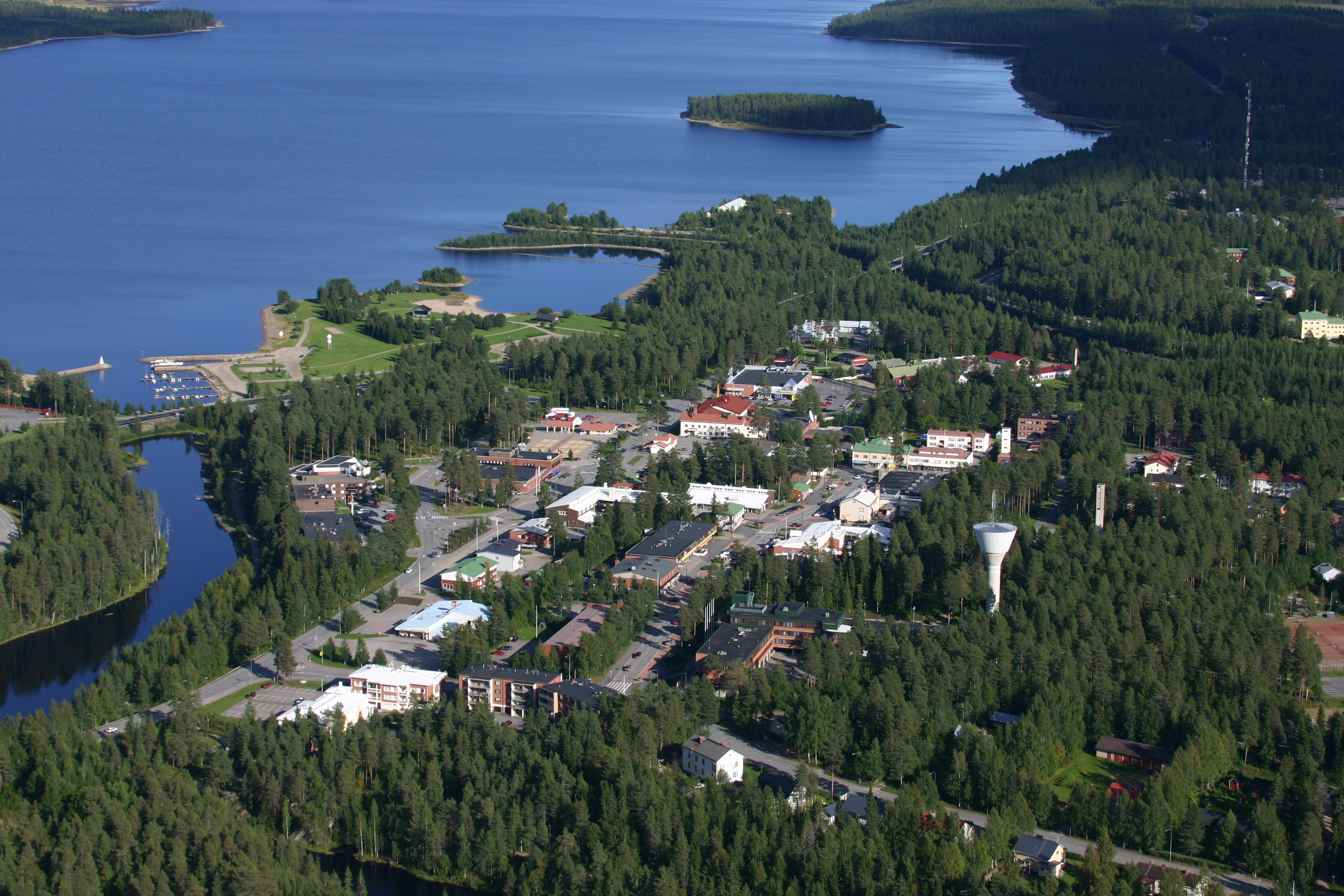
- An aerial view of Ämmänsaari, an administrative center of Suomussalmi

- Coat of arms

- Location of Suomussalmi in Finland
- Interactive map of Suomussalmi
- Coordinates: 64°53′N 028°55′E
- Country: Finland
- Region: Kainuu
- Sub-region: Kehys-Kainuu
- Charter: 1867
- Seat: Ämmänsaari

Government
  - Municipal manager: Erno Heikkinen

Area (2018-01-01)
  - Total: 5,857.60 km^{2} (2,261.63 sq mi)
  - Land: 5,270.33 km^{2} (2,034.89 sq mi)
  - Water: 587.03 km^{2} (226.65 sq mi)
  - Rank: 9th largest in Finland

Population (2025-12-31)
  - Total: 6,957
  - Rank: 132nd largest in Finland
  - Density: 1.32/km^{2} (3.4/sq mi)

Population by native language
  - Finnish: 96.2% (official)
  - Others: 3.8%

Population by age
  - 0 to 14: 10.1%
  - 15 to 64: 52%
  - 65 or older: 37.9%
- Time zone: UTC+02:00 (EET)
  - Summer (DST): UTC+03:00 (EEST)
- Website: www.suomussalmi.fi/en

Suomussalmi (Finnish: [ˈsuo̯musˌsɑlmi]) is a municipality in Finland located in the Kainuu region about 90 kilometres (56 mi) northeast of Kajaani, the capital of Kainuu and 120 kilometres (75 mi) south of Kuusamo. The municipality has a population of 6,957 (31 December 2025) and covers an area of 5,857.60 square kilometres (2,261.63 sq mi) of which 587.03 km^{2} (226.65 sq mi) is water. The population density is 1.32 inhabitants per square kilometre (3.4/sq mi). The municipality is unilingually Finnish. Ämmänsaari is the biggest built-up area in the municipality.

Suomussalmi is the second southernmost part of the reindeer-herding area in Finland.

== History ==
During the Winter War of 1939–40, several battles were fought in the area around Suomussalmi, the most important ones being the Battle of Suomussalmi and the Battle of Raate Road. In these battles, Finnish forces defeated numerically superior Soviet forces.

Suomussalmi hosted the 2016 World Berry Picking Championship.

== Villages ==
- Alajärvi
- Ala-Vuokki
- Hossa
- Jumaliskylä
- Juntusranta
- Kaljuskylä
- Kerälä
- Kiannanniemi
- Korpela
- Korvua
- Kuivajärvi
- Kurimo
- Lomakylä
- Myllylahti
- Näljänkä
- Näätälä
- Peranka
- Pesiökylä
- Pesiönlahti
- Piispajärvi
- Pisto
- Pitämä
- Pyhäkylä
- Raate
- Ruhtinansalmi
- Sakara
- Selkoskylä
- Siikaranta
- Suomussalmi (Kirkonkylä)
- Tervakangas
- Vaaranniva
- Vasara
- Vuokki
- Yli-Vuokki
- Ämmänsaari (administrative center)

Kuivajärvi and Hietajärvi, located close to the Russian border, have long belonged to the poetic villages of White Karelia, and the Karelian language, Viena Karelian, has traditionally been spoken in the area.

== Transport ==
Highway 5 (E63) comes from Hyrynsalmi via Suomussalmi to Kuusamo. The rest of the municipality's most important roads are mainly smaller regional roads; regional road 912 from Kuhmo comes to Suomussalmi, regional road 843 from Palovaara to Suomussalmi continues to Kuusamo's Poussuu, regional road 892 runs from Suomussalmi through Korpikylä and Kytömäki to Hyrynsalmi, regional road 897 offers a link between Suomussalmi's Alajärvi and Yli-Näljänkä via Hattuvaara, and connecting road 9125 or Raatteentie (also including parts of the current regional road 912) is a connecting road from Raatteenportti to Raate in the municipality of Suomussalmi, which was named after the Battle of Raate in 1940.

== Politics ==
Results of the 2023 Finnish parliamentary election in Suomussalmi:

- Centre Party 35.6%
- Finns Party 24.5%
- Left Alliance 19.6%
- National Coalition Party 7.0%
- Social Democratic Party 5.7%
- Christian Democrats 3.2%
- Green League 1.4%
- Movement Now 1.3%

== Notable people ==
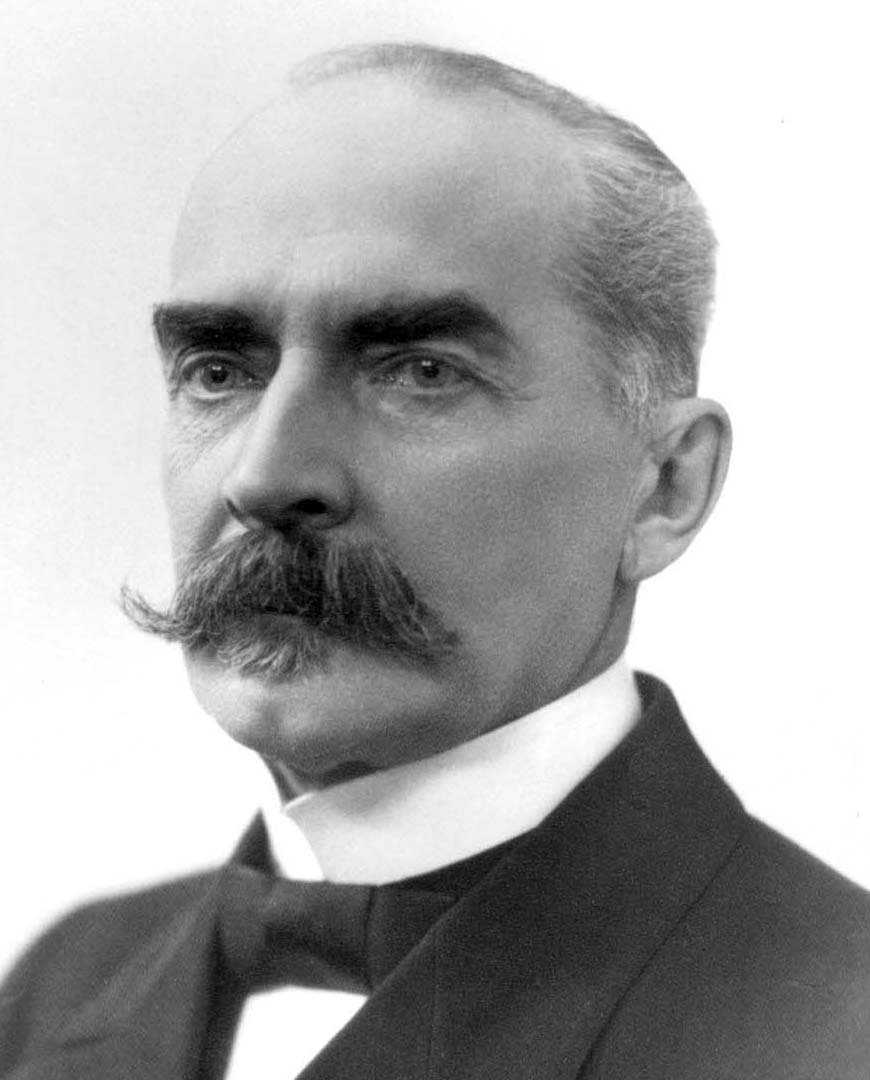
President K. J. Ståhlberg

- K. J. Ståhlberg (1865–1952), first president of Finland
- Hannes Tauriainen (1909–1971), politician
- Alho Alhoniemi (born 1933), linguist
- Toini Gustafsson (born 1938), former cross-country skier
- Matti Makkonen (1952–2015), engineer
- Osmo Tapio Räihälä (born 1964), composer
- Tero Penttilä (born 1975), former professional footballer
- Merja Kyllönen (born 1977), politician
- Heikki Kovalainen (born 1981), racing driver
- Janne Pesonen (born 1982), former professional ice hockey player

== International relations ==
=== Twin towns — Sister cities ===
Suomussalmi is twinned with:

- Kalevala, Russia
- Nordmaling Municipality, Sweden
