= Endla =

Endla may refer to:

in Estonia

- Endla Theatre, theatre in Pärnu
- Endla (organization), organization based in Pärnu
- Endla, Jõgeva County, village in Jõgeva Parish, Jõgeva County
  - Lake Endla, lake in Kärde village, Jõgeva Parish, Jõgeva County
- Endla, Saare County, village in Saaremaa Parish, Saare County

in India

- Endla, Rajasthan
