= Vanemuine (disambiguation) =

Vanemuine is the theatre in Tartu, Estonia.

Vanemuine may also refer to:

- Vanemuine (god) Estonian mythological character
- Vanemuine Concert Hall, Tartu, Estonia
- Vanemuine Cultural Society, Estonia
