= Finnish flood myth =

Part of Finnish folk poetry

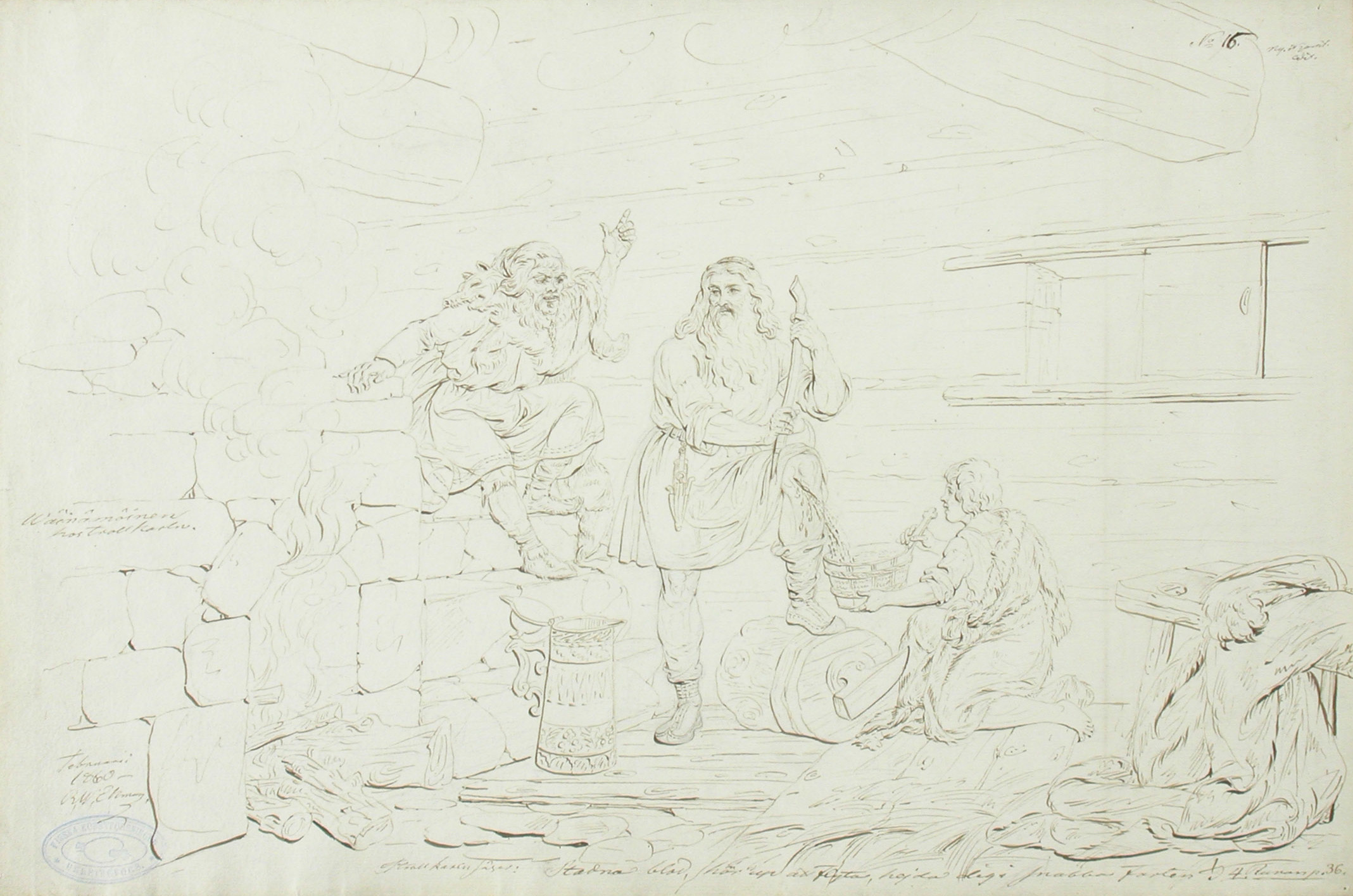
The Knee Wound of Väinämöinen

The Finnish flood myth is recorded in the Kalevala rune entitled Haava (The Wound, section 8). Väinämöinen attempts a heroic feat that results in a gushing wound, the blood from which covers the entire Earth. This deluge is not emphasized in the Kalevala version redacted by Elias Lönnrot, but the global quality of the flood is evident in original variants of the rune. In one variant collected in Northern Ostrobothnia in 1803/04, the rune tells:

The blood came forth like a flood
the gore ran like a river:
there was no hummock
and no high mountain
that was not flooded
all from Väinämöinen's toe
from the holy hero's knee.

Matti Kuusi notes in his analysis that the rune's motifs of constructing a boat, a wound, and a flood have parallels with flood myths from around the world. There are sources that cite this flood mythology to the nature of Kalevala as a comparative mythology, which borrowed elements from stories found in other ancient sources such as the Persians, Phoenicians, the Bible and Greek mythology, then integrated it with the myth's personification of nature. The account of the great flood was embedded in a narrative that also featured the Greek sun-myths and moon-myths. These influences are not found in the myths of Finland's Slavic and Scandinavian neighbors. However, a theory explained this aspect to Finnish myth as a relic of the earliest Asiatic life of one of the Finnish ancestors.

According to Anna-Leena Siikala, Väinämöinen's legs are of mythological and cosmogonic significance throughout Finnish mythology. For example, it is originally on Väinämöinen's knee that the primordial water-fowl first lays the world egg.
