= Joukahainen =

Väinämöinen's rival in Finnish mythology

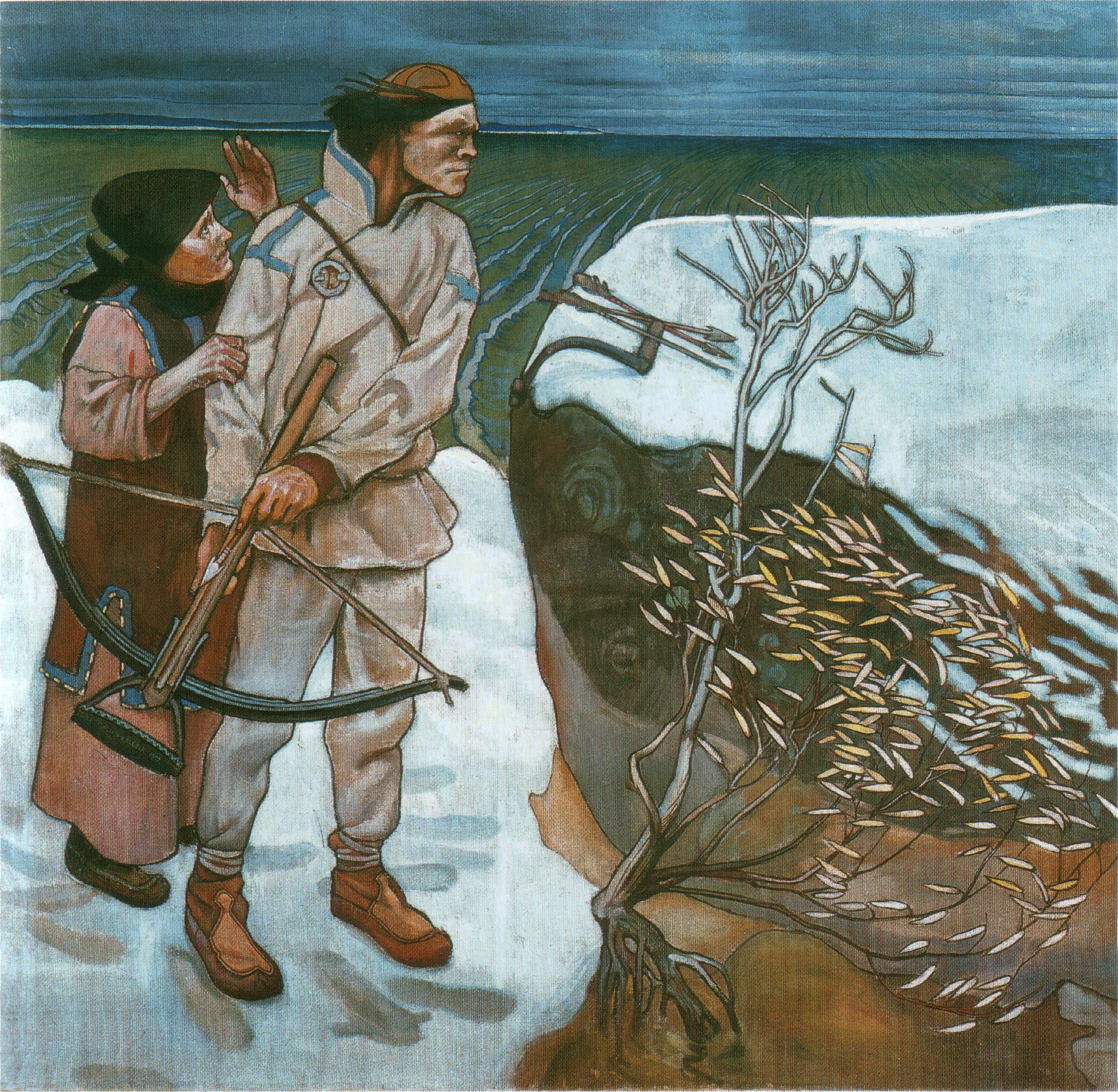
Joukahainen's Revenge by Akseli Gallen-Kallela in 1897, where Joukahainen is preparing to shoot Väinämöinen

Joukahainen (Finnish pronunciation: [ˈjou̯kɑˌhɑi̯nen]) is a figure in Finnish mythology who appears as a rival or companion of Väinämöinen. There has been debate among scholars if he should be categorized as a god, a hero, an evil being, or something else.

His name has multiple different variations in runic songs, including Jokkahas, Jompainen, Joukava, Joukkaha, Joukkahas, Joukkama, Joukamoinen, Joukavainen, Joukkahainen, Joukkavainen and Joutavoinen.

== Name ==
Emil Nestor Setälä connected Joukahainen's name to Sámi words related to snowfall and solidifying and called him a god, the haltija of ice and snow, who was defeated by water haltija Väinämöinen. Kaarle Krohn considered Joukahainen to be a human hero and speculated if his name had a connection to the Estonian jõud 'power' or Finnish joukea 'slender, large-sized'. As the name Joukahainen has been connected to joukainen 'swan', Risto Pulkkinen called Joukahainen the shaman of a swan clan.

== In runic songs ==
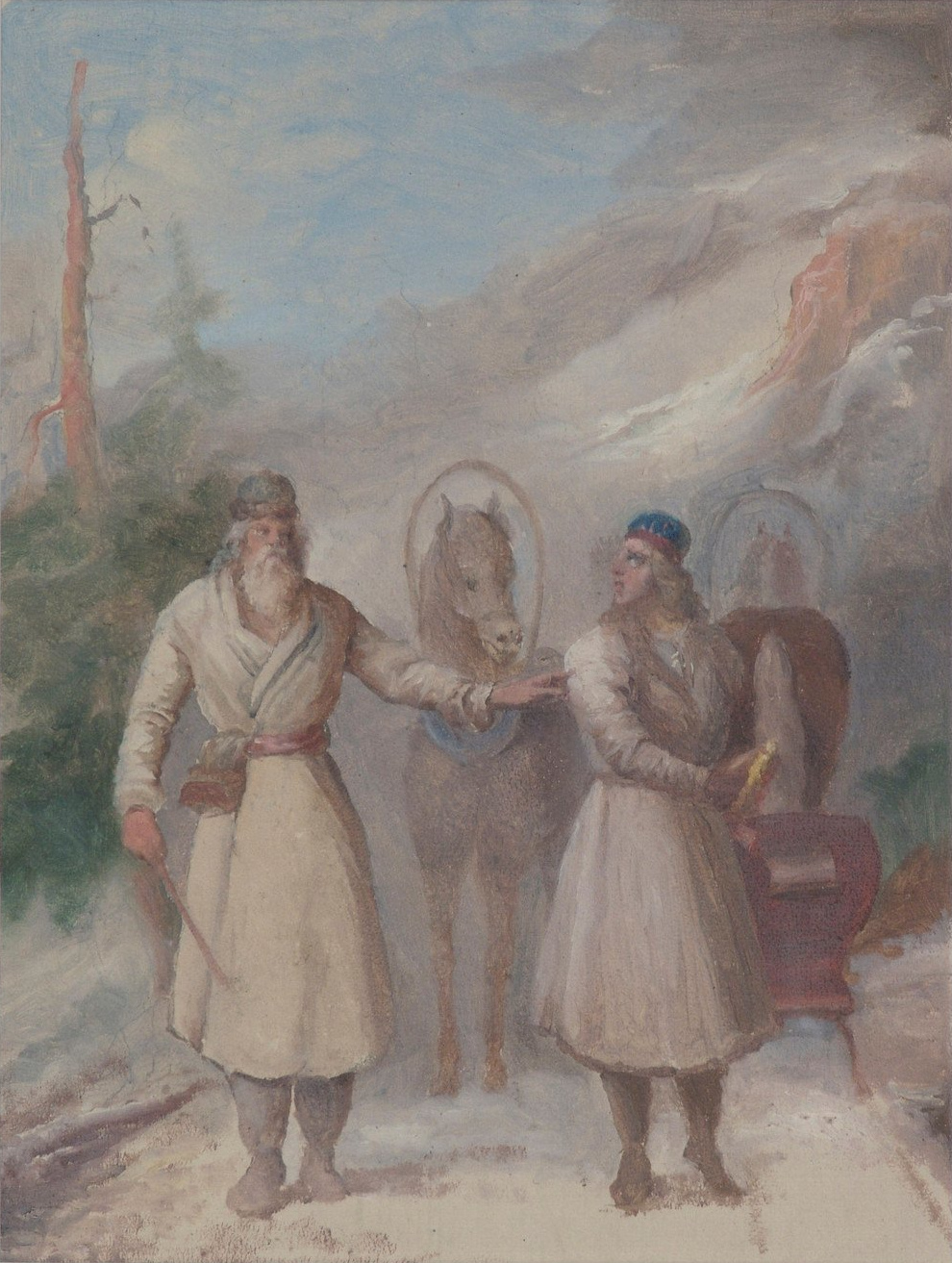
The Meeting of Väinämöinen and Joukahainen, Berndt Godenhjelm

In some runic songs, Joukahainen is mentioned to be a brother of Väinämöinen, though this is not the case in all versions, as White Karelian poems refer to Väinämöinen as Joukahainen's aunt's son, and some poems also refer to Joukahainen as an inhabitant of Pohjola. In his 1782 book De superstitione veterum fennorum, Christian Erici Lenqvist called Joukahainen a god. Christfried Ganander called him a giant in his 1789 book Mythologia Fennica.

Joukahainen appears in a myth which describes the runic singing battle between him and Väinämöinen. It has been described as the first ever such confrontation and interpreted as a battle between two skilled shamans. The two come face to face on the same path on land or water, and Joukahainen challenges Väinämöinen by suggesting that the one who has less knowledge should be the one to give way. Joukahainen sings about things he remembers had happened in the beginning: the bottom of the sea had been formed, the stars had been set in the sky and mountains had been created. This knowledge is no match for Väinämöinen, who expresses his superior knowledge by stating that he was the one who made all of those things happen. Joukahainen's epithet is nuori 'young' while Väinämöinen is vanha 'old' and therefore wiser. The song portrays the authority an older person has over a younger person, which is true even in the hierarchy of divine heroes.

In one version of the myth, the battle ends only after a dwarf-sized dark man (called the King of the Sea according to Ganander) rises from the waters to stop it. A rare North Savo version have Väinämöinen and Joukahainen fighting over fire: Väinämöinen makes fire by rubbing pieces of wood against each other, while Joukahainen was trying to burn Väinämöinen's area by rubbing two rocks together. Väinämöinen has to ask the king of the sea to help him put out the fire. This was possibly a spell related to slash-and-burn agriculture.

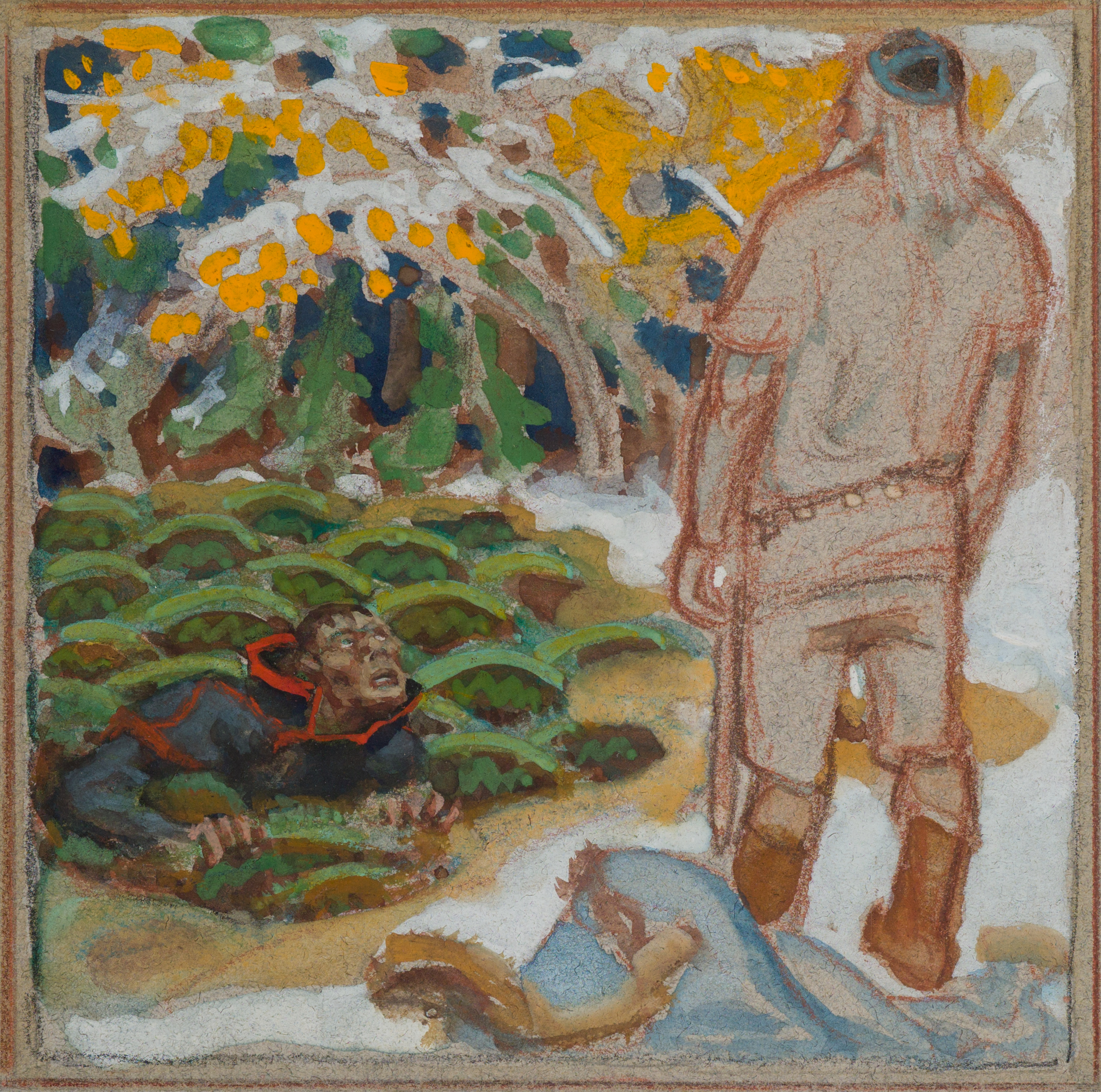
Joukahainen in the mire, Great Kalevala by Akseli Gallen-Kallela, 1925

In another version, Väinämöinen proceeds to sing (spellcast) Joukahainen into a bog or cold water, which symbolize a path to the underworld. Joukahainen begs Väinämöinen to let him go, promising his only sister as Väinämöinen's wife which Väinämöinen accepts. Drowning someone in water was a popular method of execution in Medieval Europe. In Karelian songs, Joukahainen later cries about having done this but his mother consoles him by saying that she'll gladly have a great man like Väinämöinen in the family. It shows that in Baltic Finnic tradition, the mother and brother of a girl were responsible for her marriage as opposed to western, nomadic pastoralist, and other patriarchal cultures, where this was the right of the father.

In Central Finland, the battle story gained a new context: Väinämöinen was jealous of his brother Joukahainen, who had made a boat.

Joukahainen also appears as Väinämöinen's companion on his adventures. In Ostrobothnia and South Savo, Väinämöinen asks his brother Joukahainen to bring him three magic words from the great shaman Antero Vipunen which he needs in order to be able to finish building his boat. However, Joukahainen says that Vipunen is long since dead.

Joukahainen accompanies Väinämöinen to steal the sampo from Pohjola in a Forest Finnish version of the myth. When they are escaping with it on a boat, Joukahainen asks Väinämöinen to start singing his spells but Väinämöinen refuses, saying that the gates of Pohjola are still too close. Eventually, he starts singing. The sampo then flies out of the boat into the clouds and Joukahainen jumps after it and strikes it with his sword. He only manages to cut off two toes from the sampo, one which fell into the sea, making it salty, and the other fell on land, making wild hay grow. If only he had been able to cut off more toes, crops would grow on their own without the need of farming. Krohn saw this as a description where the sampo and Loviatar turned into a kokko bird had fused into one, like sampo itself was a bird. Väinö Salminen pointed out the Forest Finn belief that storm itself was an evil being, a storm bird from Pohjola, like it was the storm bird which had taken the sampo from Väinämöinen and Joukahainen's boat.

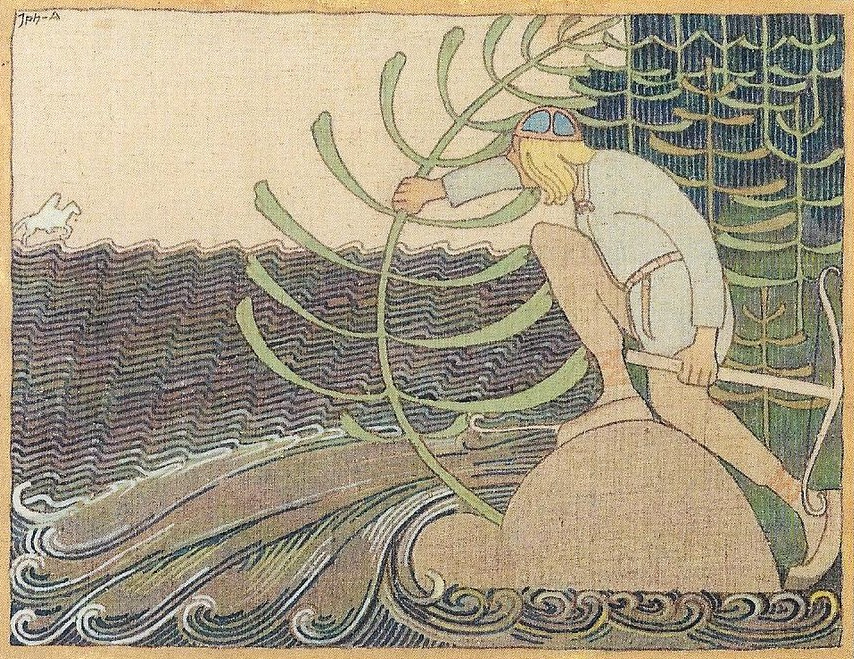
Revenge of Joukahainen, Joseph Alanen, 1919–1920

In White Karelian runic songs, Joukahainen is connected to the lappalainen (Sámi) who shot Väinämöinen into the primordial sea. As a result, Väinämöinen lied on the bottom of the sea with his knee on the surface, and a bird laid an egg on his knee. When Väinämöinen moved his knee and the eggs fell and broke, the world was born. This version was also known in inland Finland but had become partially forgotten by the 19th century.

Kainuu tietäjä Jeremias "Kovan Jeru" Seppänen referred to the one who shot Väinämöinen as Pohjolan pitkä poika ("tall son of Pohjola") and Antti Joukkahainen.

In Border Karelia, when someone needs to catch the Sun from top of a pine, Joukahainen and Ilmarinen make failed attempts to do so. Only Väinämöinen succeeds. In White Karelia, Väinämöinen is also portrayed as a better seine fisher than Joukahainen.

In Ladoga Karelia, Väinämöinen, Ilmarinen and Joukahainen are sons born from the maiden Iro (after Saint Irene) or Maaria (Virgin Mary).

== Comparisons ==
According to Anna-Leena Siikala, the battle of knowledge between Väinämöinen and Joukahainen resembles that of Odin and Vafþrúðnir from Norse mythology.

== In the Kalevala ==
After clashing with their horses and challenging Väinämöinen to a fight, they engage in a battle of song. He loses and is magically sung into being swallowed by a mire. In his plea for help from Väinämöinen, he pledges his sister Aino to him. But she objects to Väinämöinen, and rather than marrying him she drowns herself. Joukahainen is enraged by all that has taken place and even though his mother tries to stop him, he ambushes Väinämöinen with his crossbow. Joukahainen misses Väinämöinen but hits and kills his horse from under him, making him plunge into the icy waters of Pohjola.

In the original translation into English (by John Martin Crawford (1888)) this character's name was Anglicised as Youkahainen.

== Gallery ==
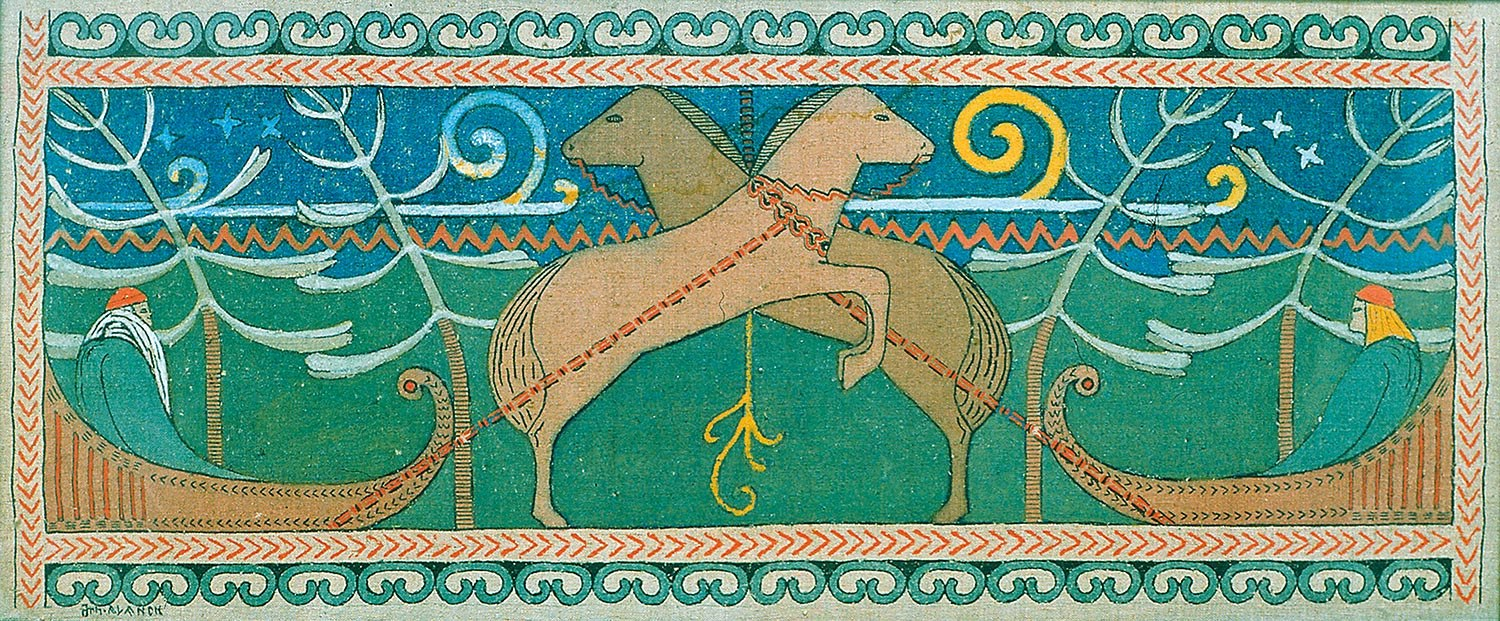
The Clash of Väinämöinen and Joukahainen, Joseph Alanen, 1909–1910

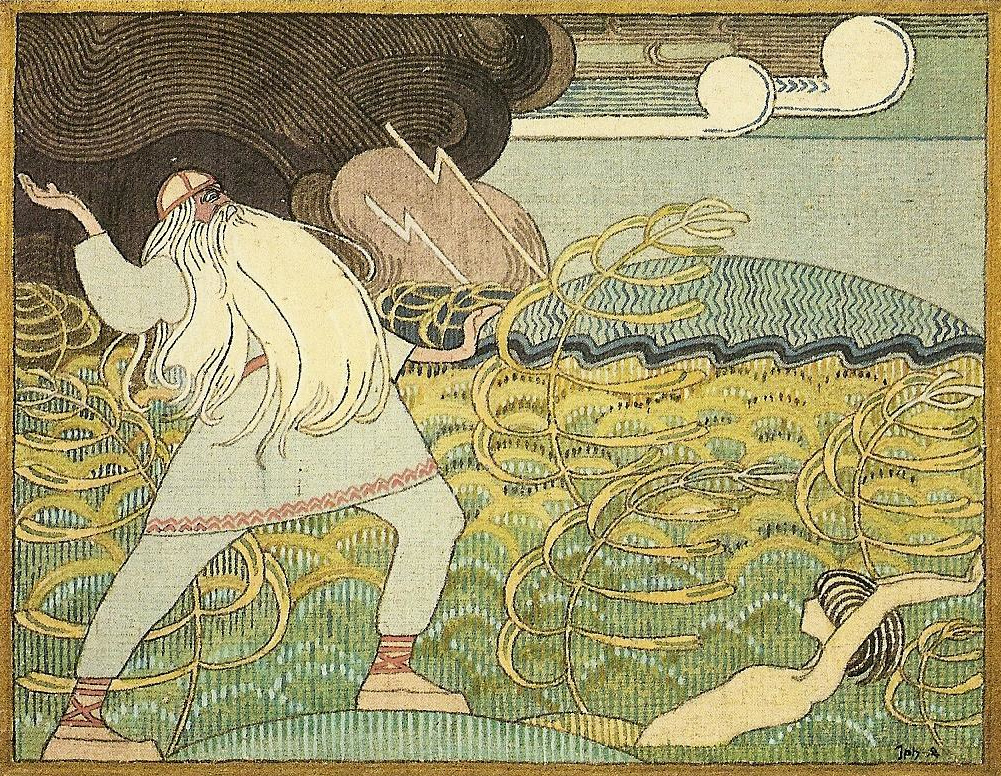
Väinämöinen Sings Joukahainen into a Mire, Joseph Alanen, 1912–1913
