= Berndt Godenhjelm =

Finnish painter (1799–1881)

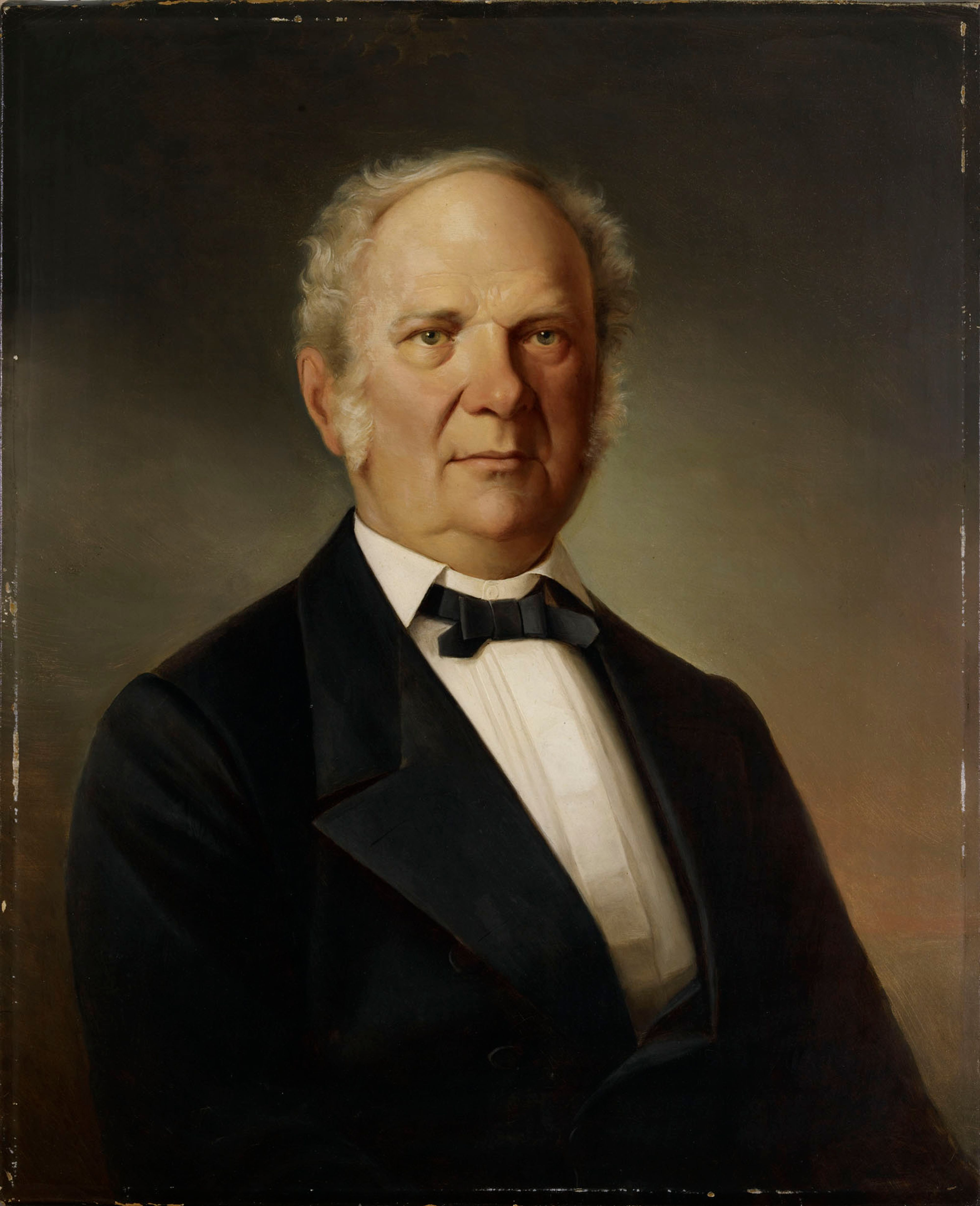
- Self-portrait, 1869
- Born: Berndt Abraham Godenhjelm; 30 March 1799; Mäntyharju, Grand Duchy of Finland, Russian Empire
- Died: 14 December 1881 (aged 82); Helsinki, Grand Duchy of Finland, Russian Empire
- Known for: Painting

Berndt Abraham Godenhjelm (March 30, 1799 – 14 December 1881) was a Finnish painter.

== Personal life ==
Godenhjelm was born in Mäntyharju. His parents were the county surveyor Adolf Fredrik Godenhjelm and Maria Elizabeth Argillander. His wife was Alexandra Fredrika Hornborg (died 1871). Their son B. F. Godenhjelm became a teacher.

== Early career ==
He studied landscape painting in Stockholm under Per Gustaf von Heideken, and later he studied copper drawing in Saint Petersburg. He initially began his career in the courts, where he worked as an articled clerks deputy judge in 1826. However soon after he transitioned to painting, primarily producing commissioned works for churches and portraits.

== Works and memberships ==
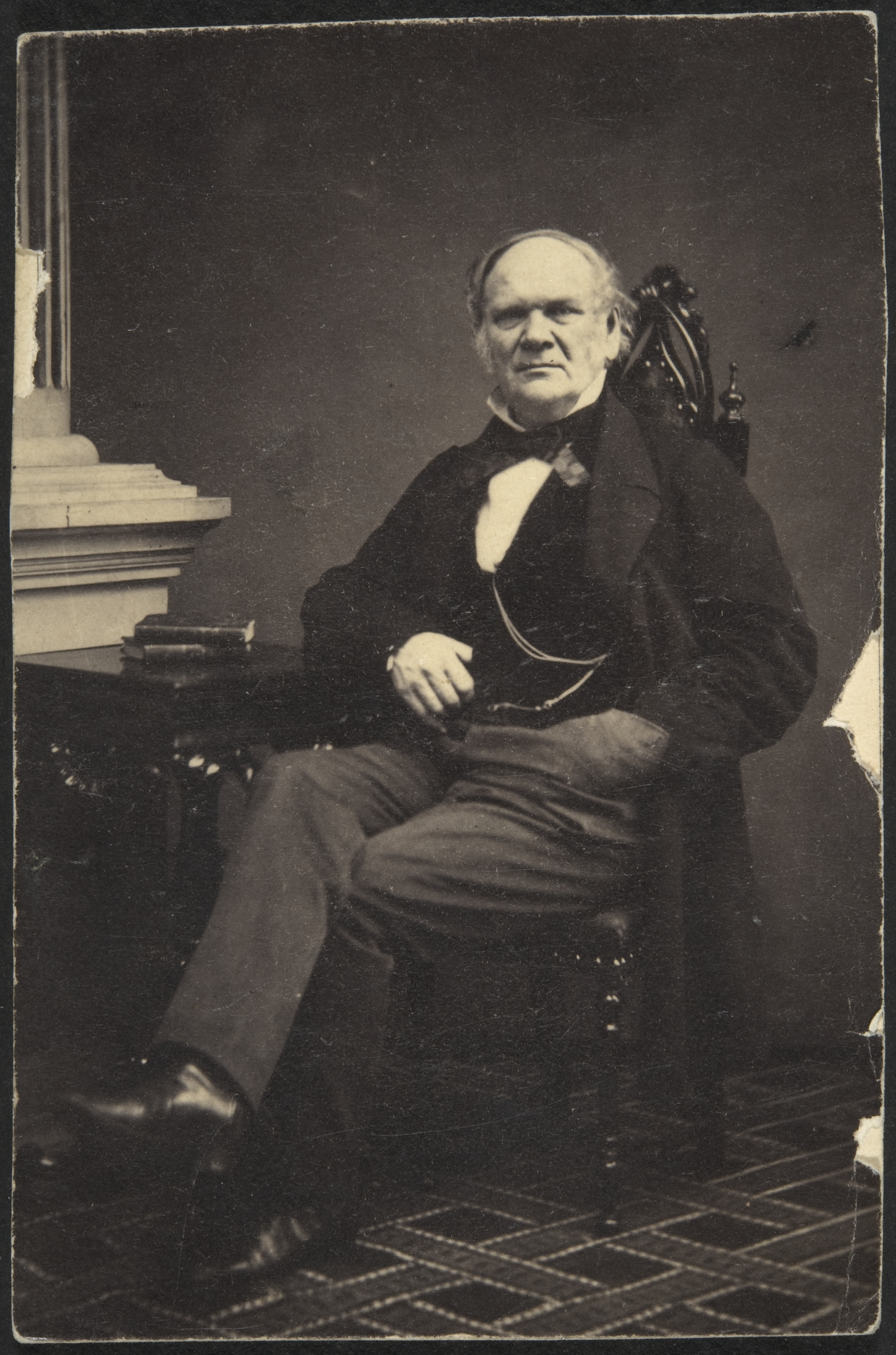
Photograph of Godenhjelm, likely from the early 1860s

During his career, he painted dozens of altarpieces including ones for the Mäntyharju church, the Lovage church, the Liperi church (1842), the Jämsä church (1848), the Ikaalinen church (1874) and Finnish Lutheran Church in Sitka, Alaska founded by Uno Cygnaeus in 1840. Some of his works have been preserved at the Tampere Art Museum and the National Museum of Finland. Godenhjelm was head teacher at the Academy of Fine Arts, Helsinki drawing school from 1848 to 1869. He was an honorary member of the Artists' Association of Finland in 1864, and a board member of the Finnish Art Society from 1852 to 1868.

== Works ==
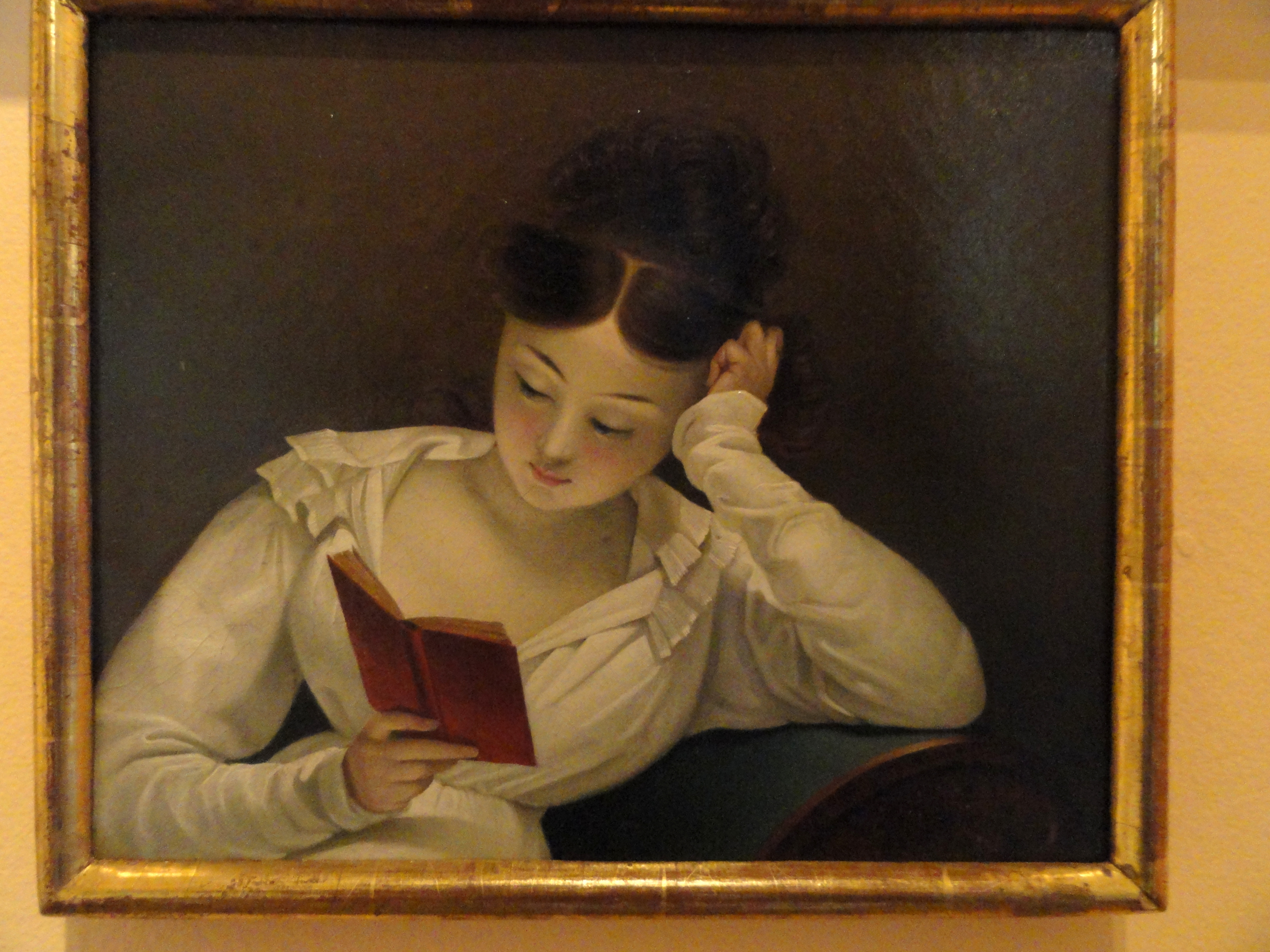
A Girl Reading, 1830

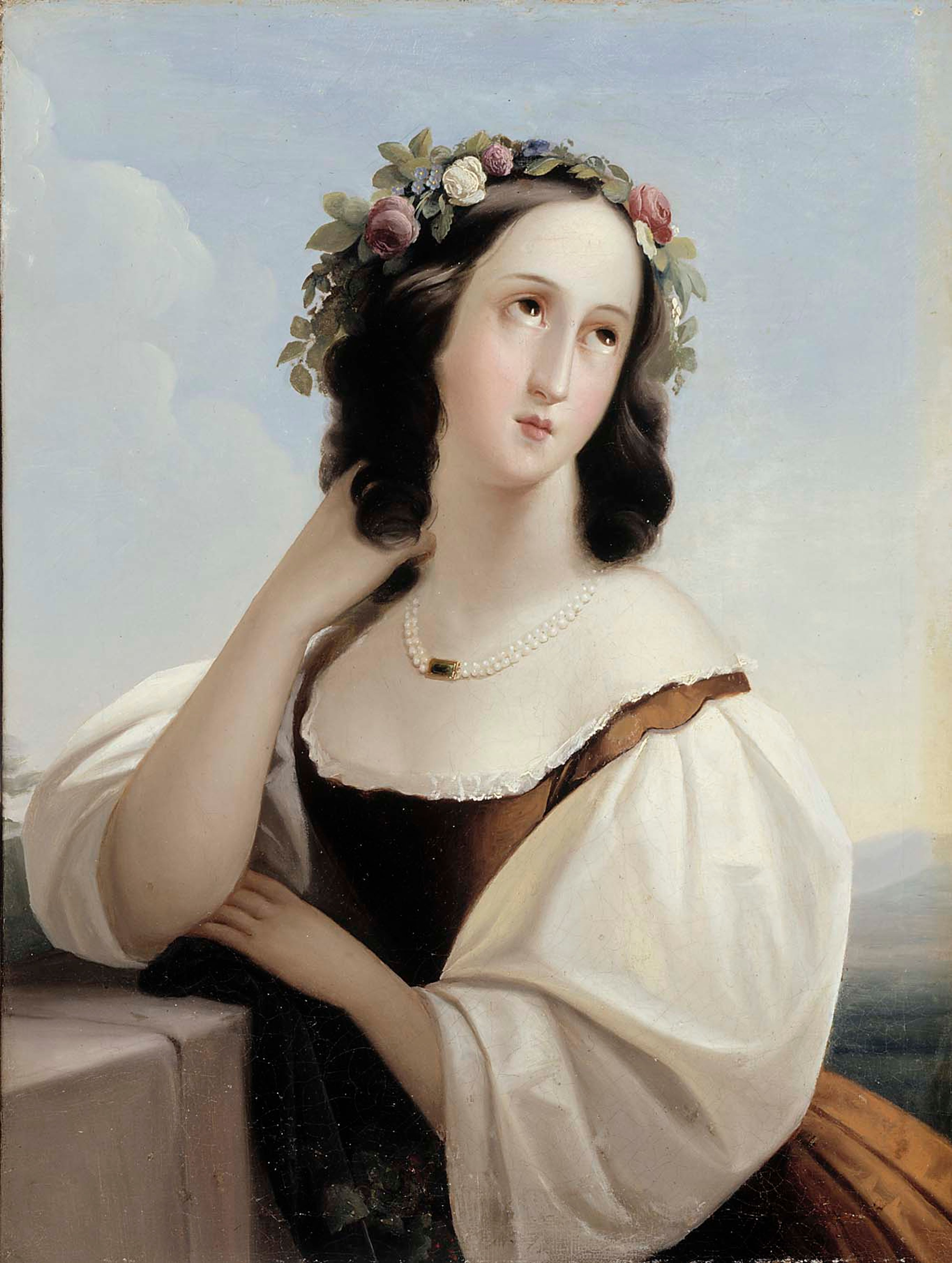
Portrait of a Young Woman, unknown date

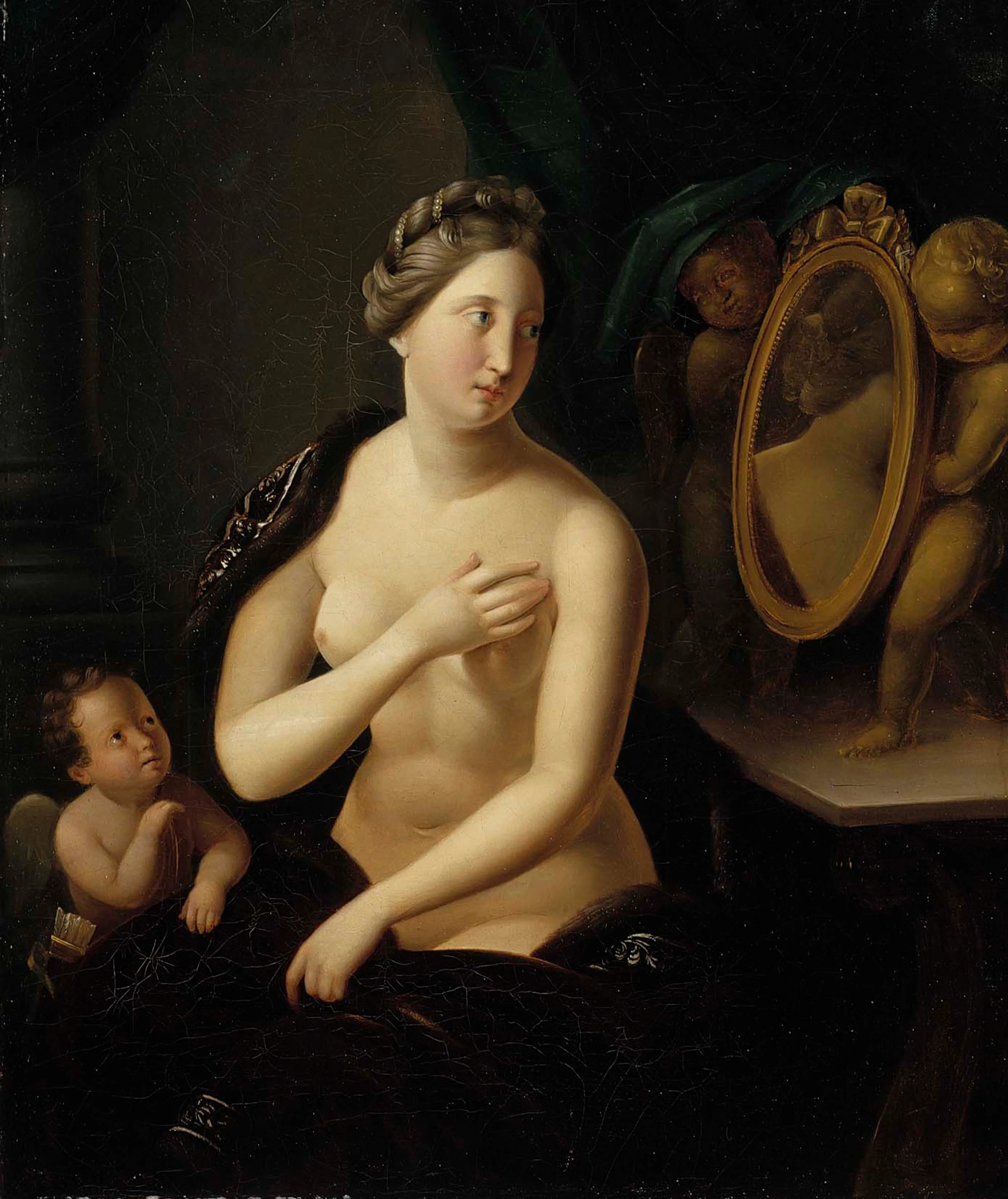
Woman Looking in the Mirror

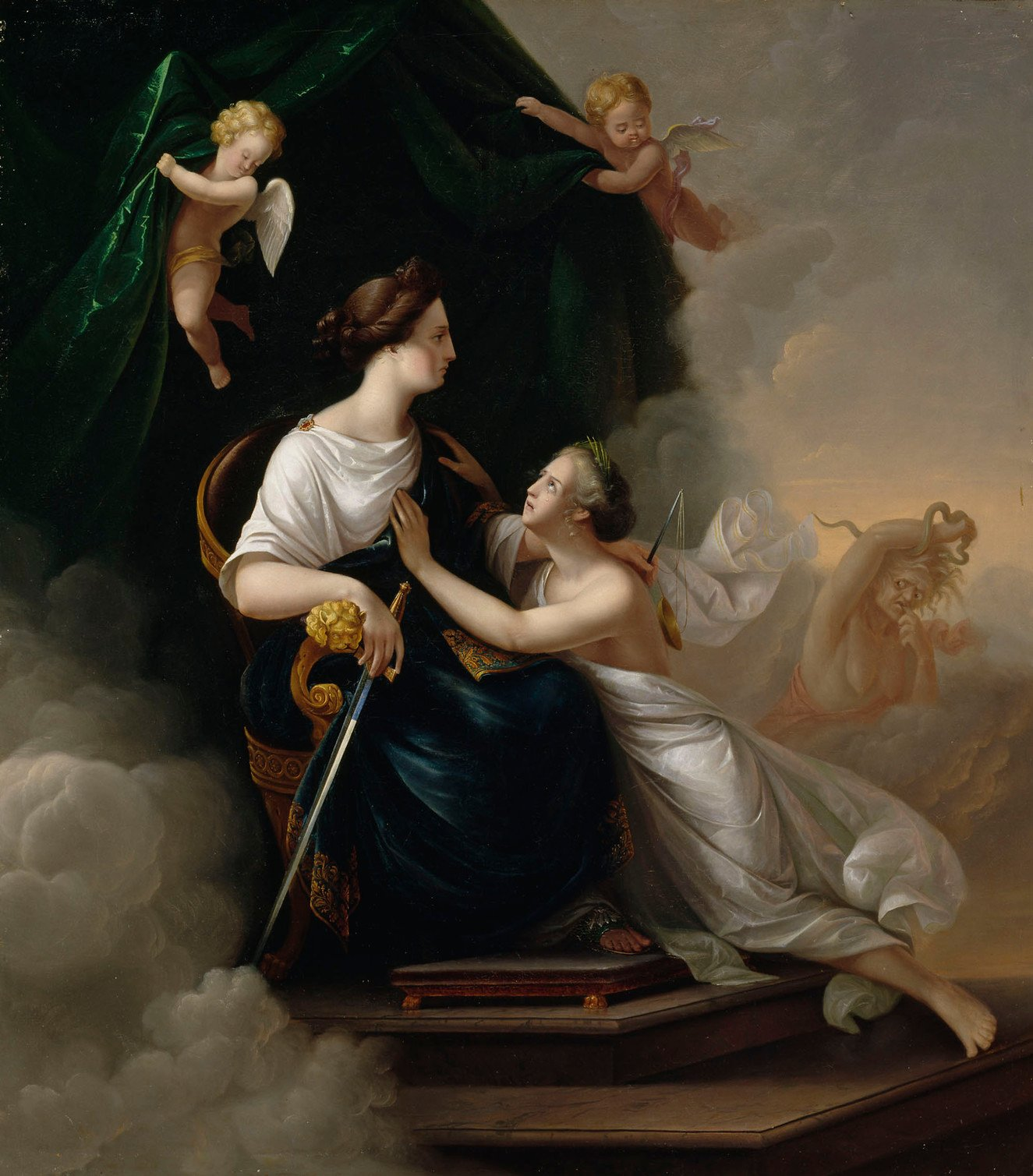
Justice and Innocence, 1832

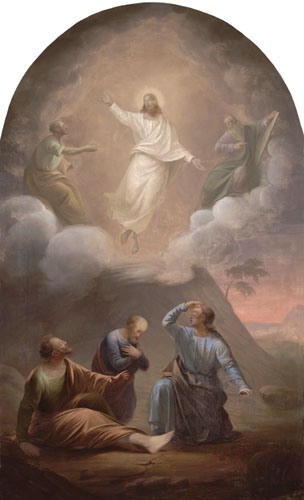
Transfiguration of Jesus, 1839

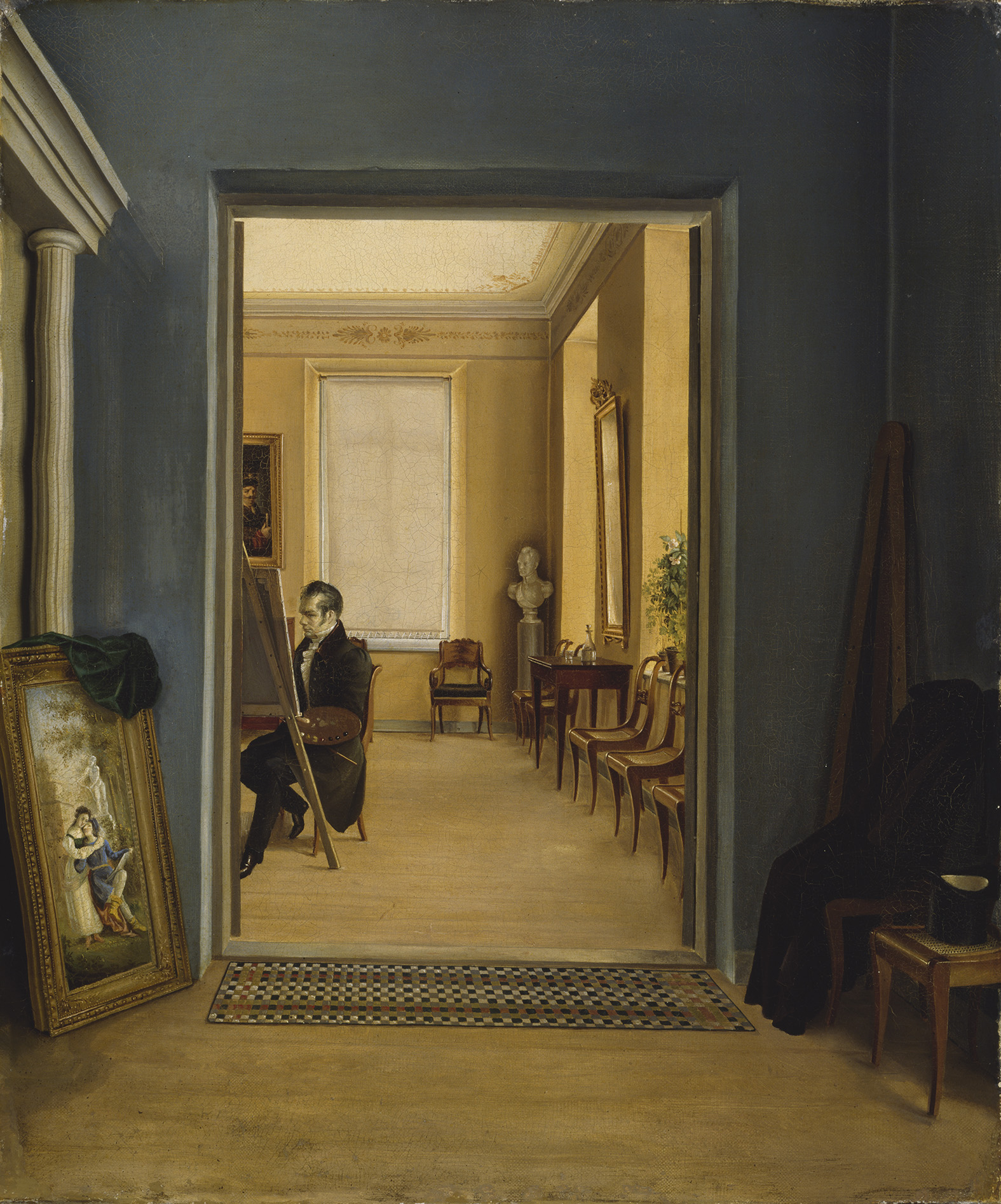
Self-Portrait in a St. Petersburg atelier, 1830–49

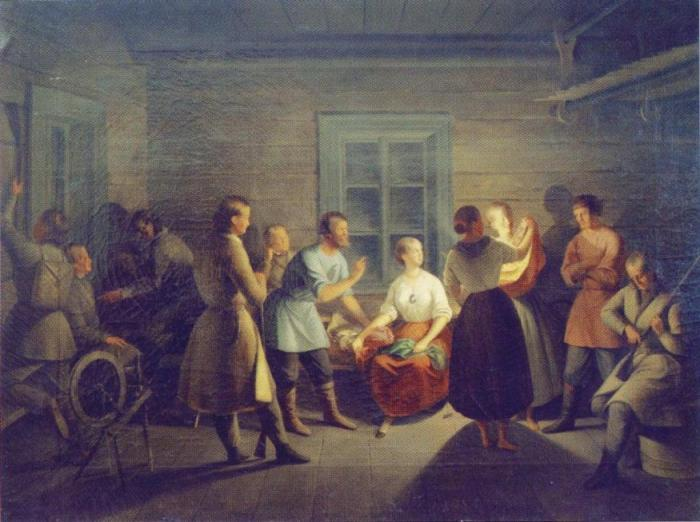
Scene from J. L. Runeberg´s "Moose Hunters", 1840s

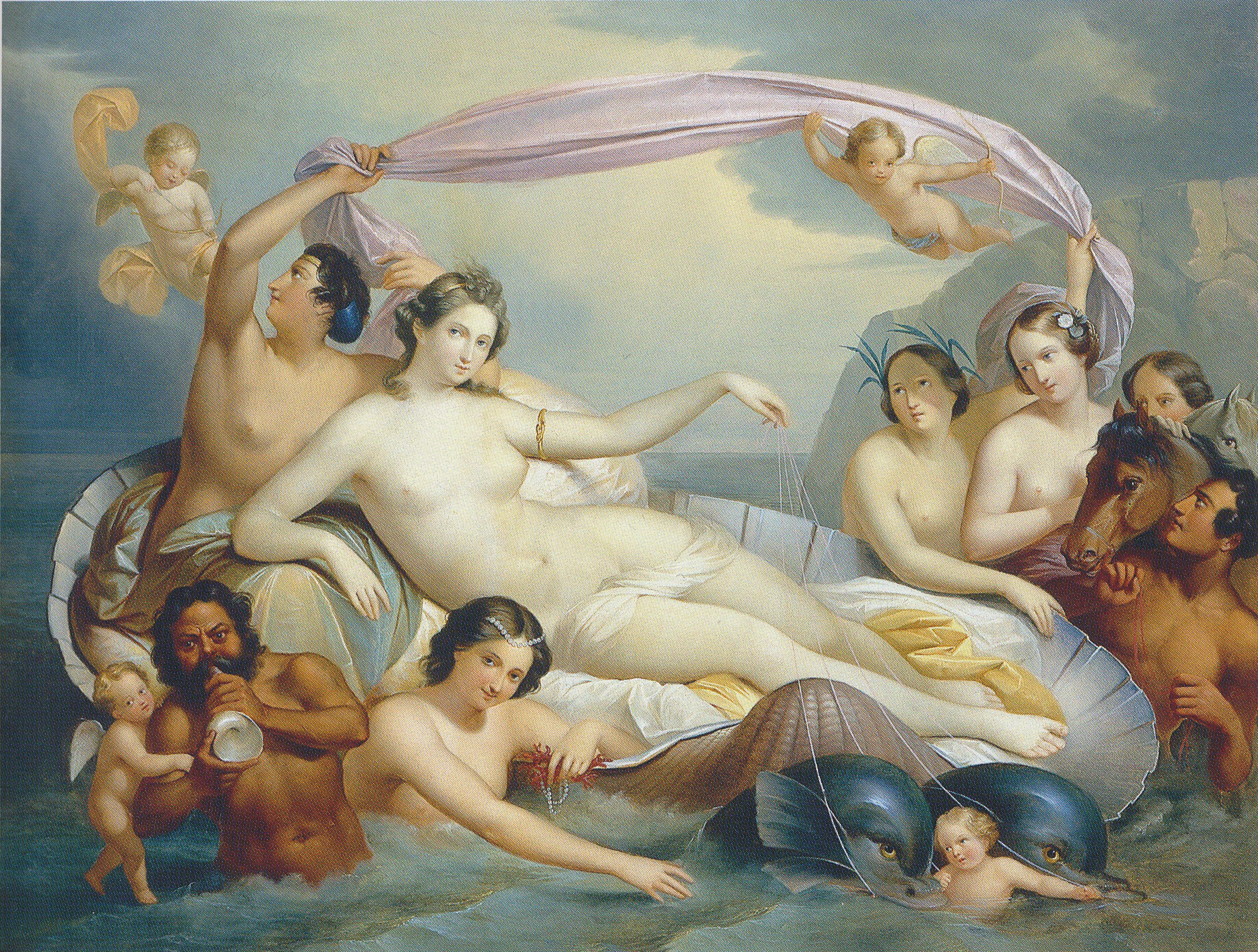
Galatea's Triumph, 1840s

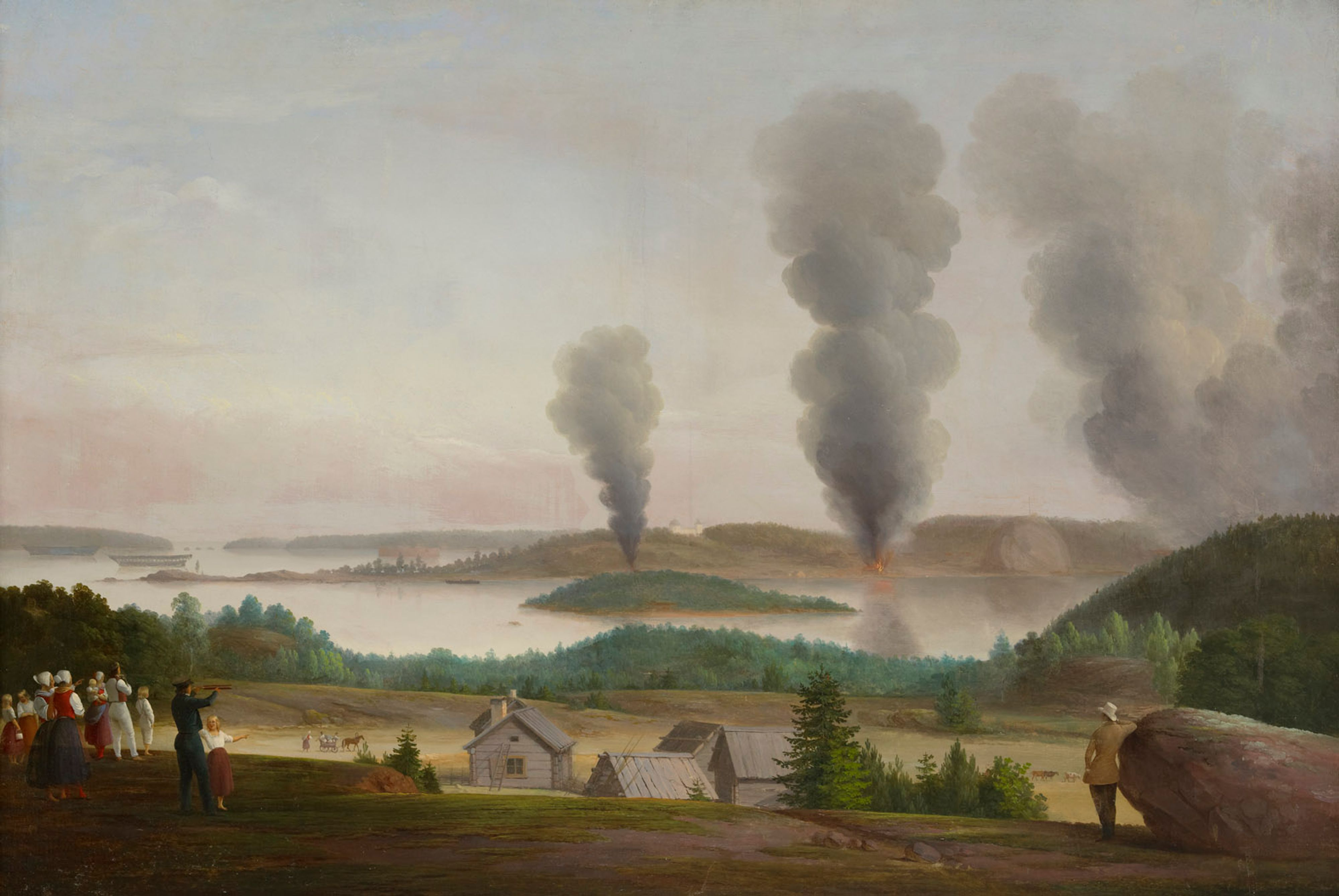
Ruotsinsalmi is Burning, Scene from the Crimean War, 1855–56

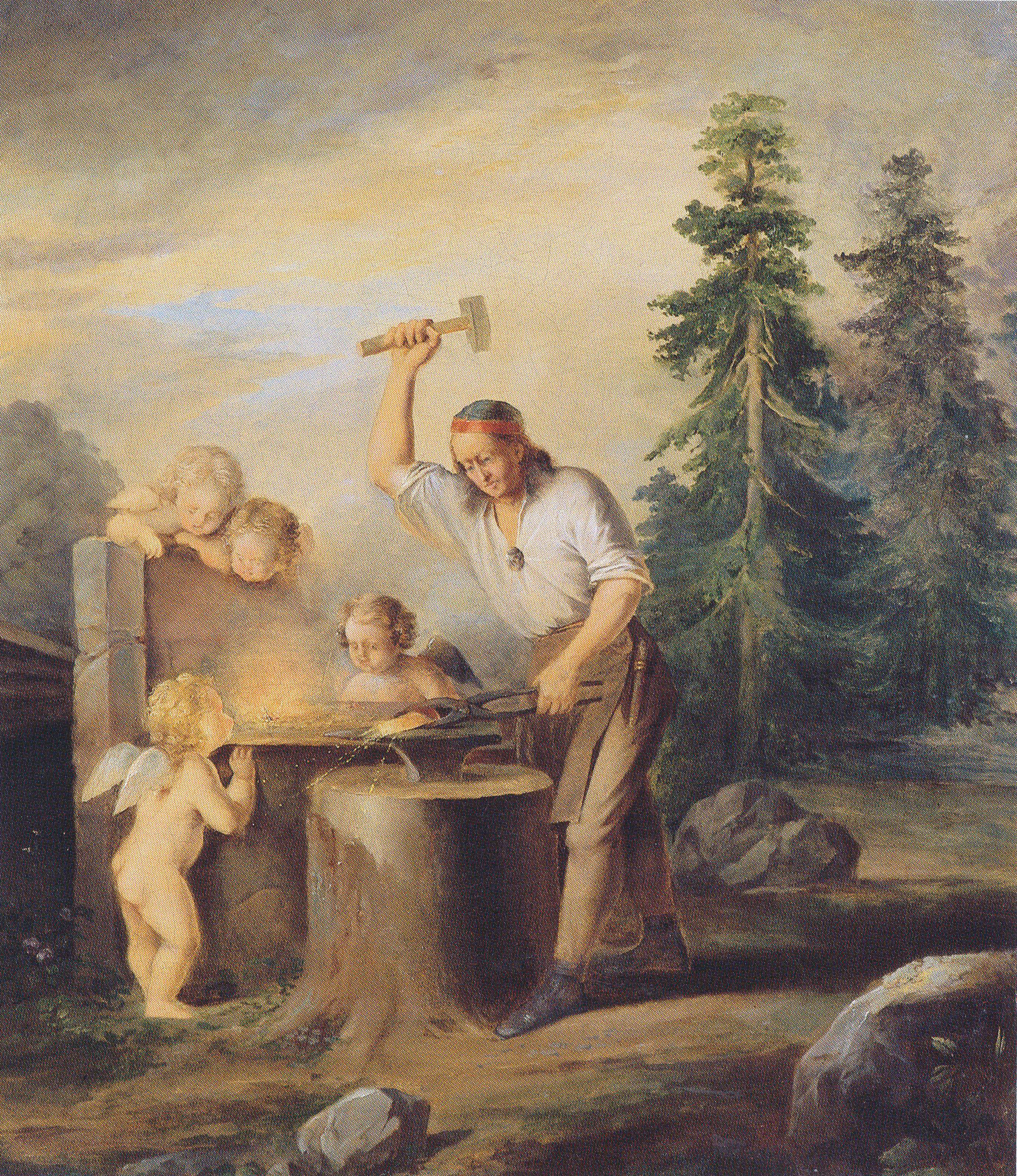
Ilmarinen Forges the Sampo, unknown date

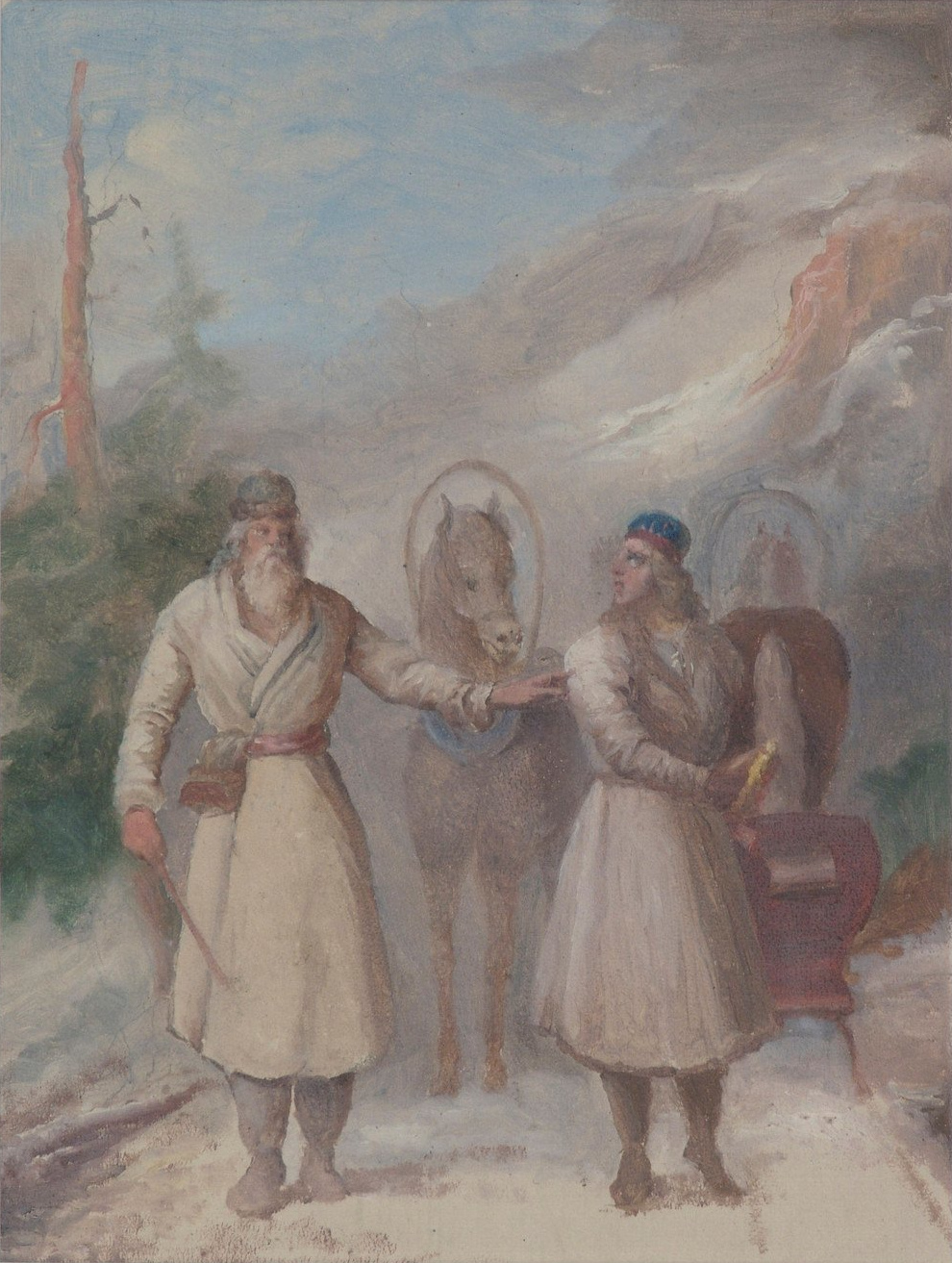
The Meeting of Väinämöinen and Joukahainen, Sketch

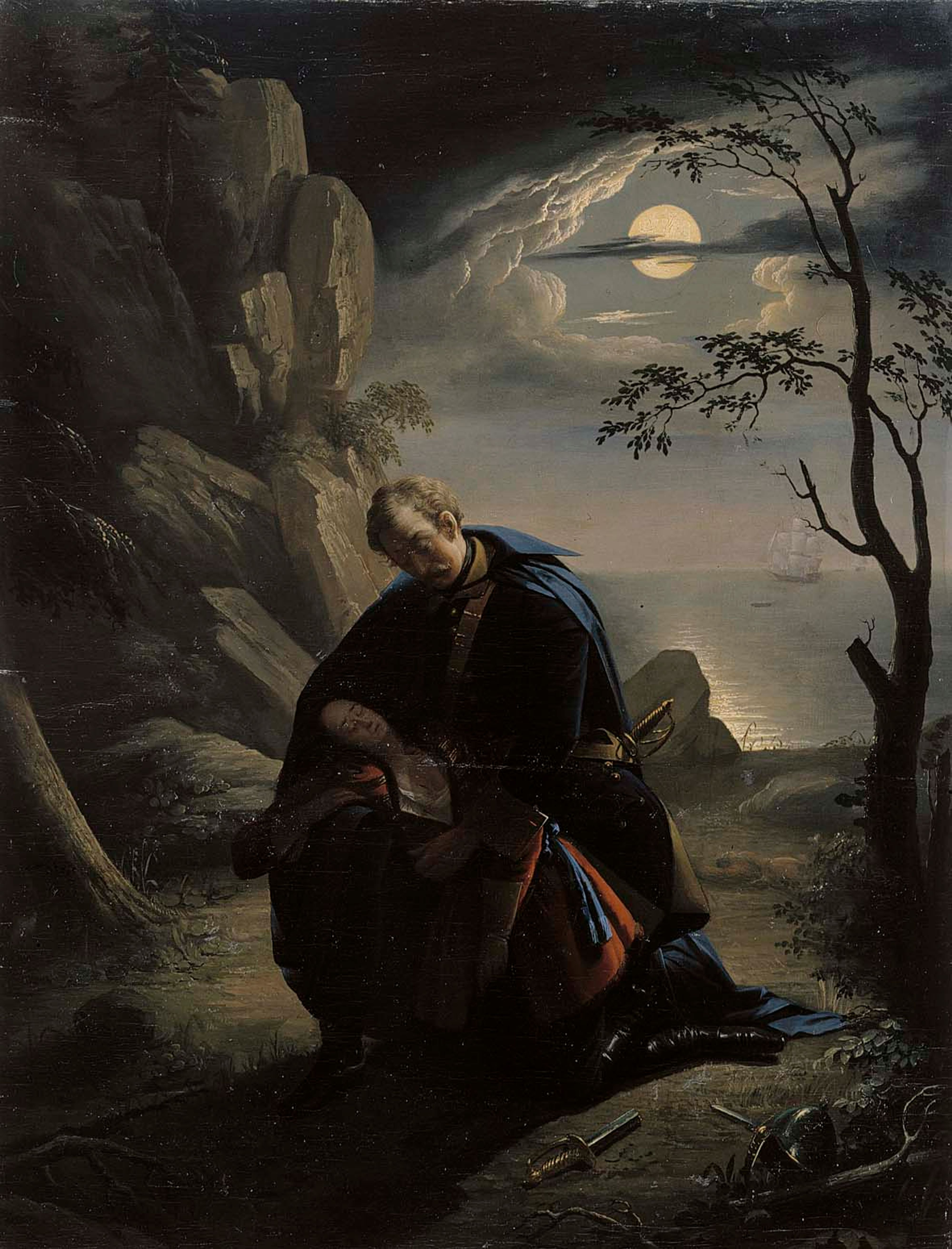
Swedish Soldier and Polish Girl

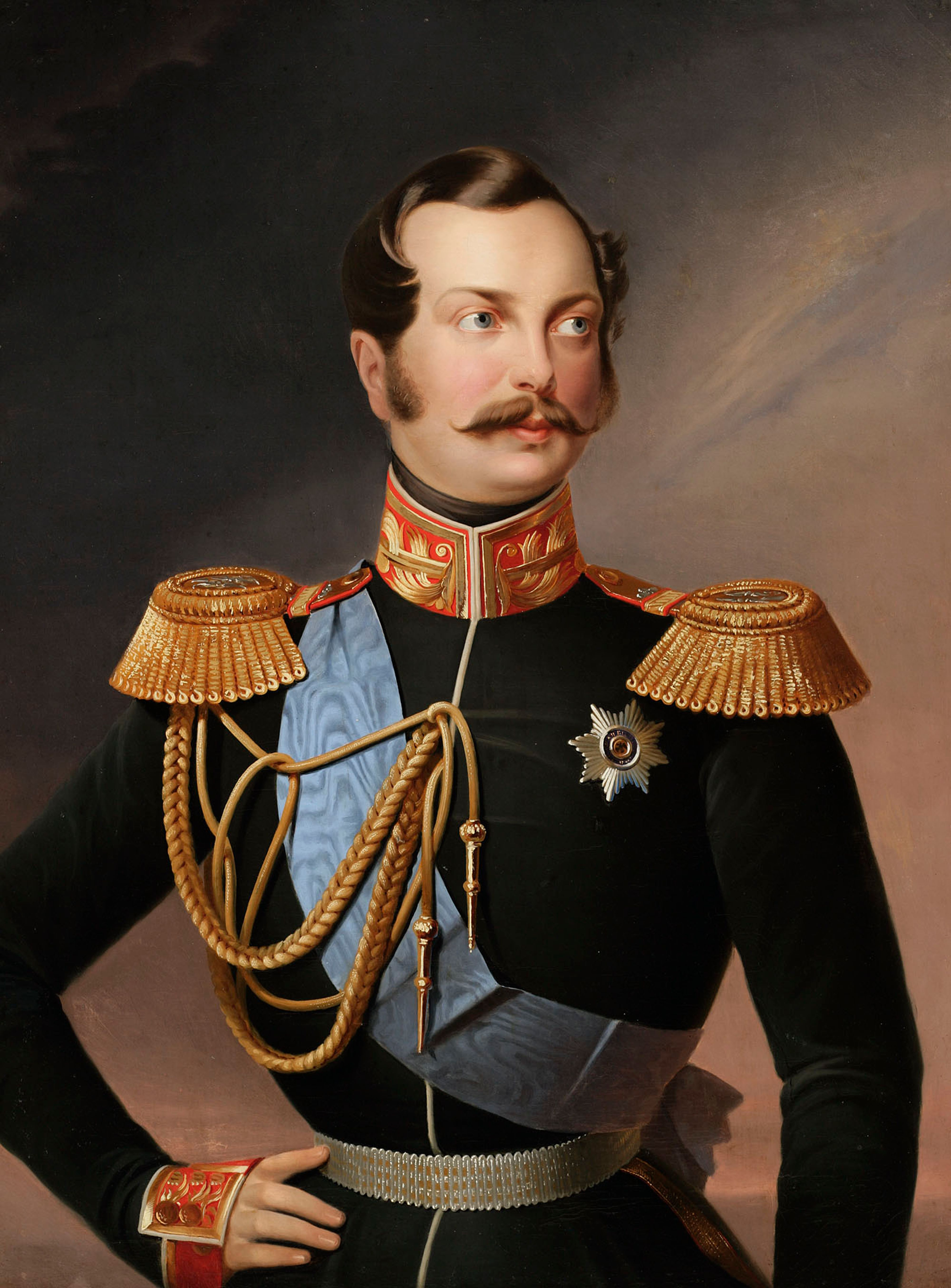
Alexander II

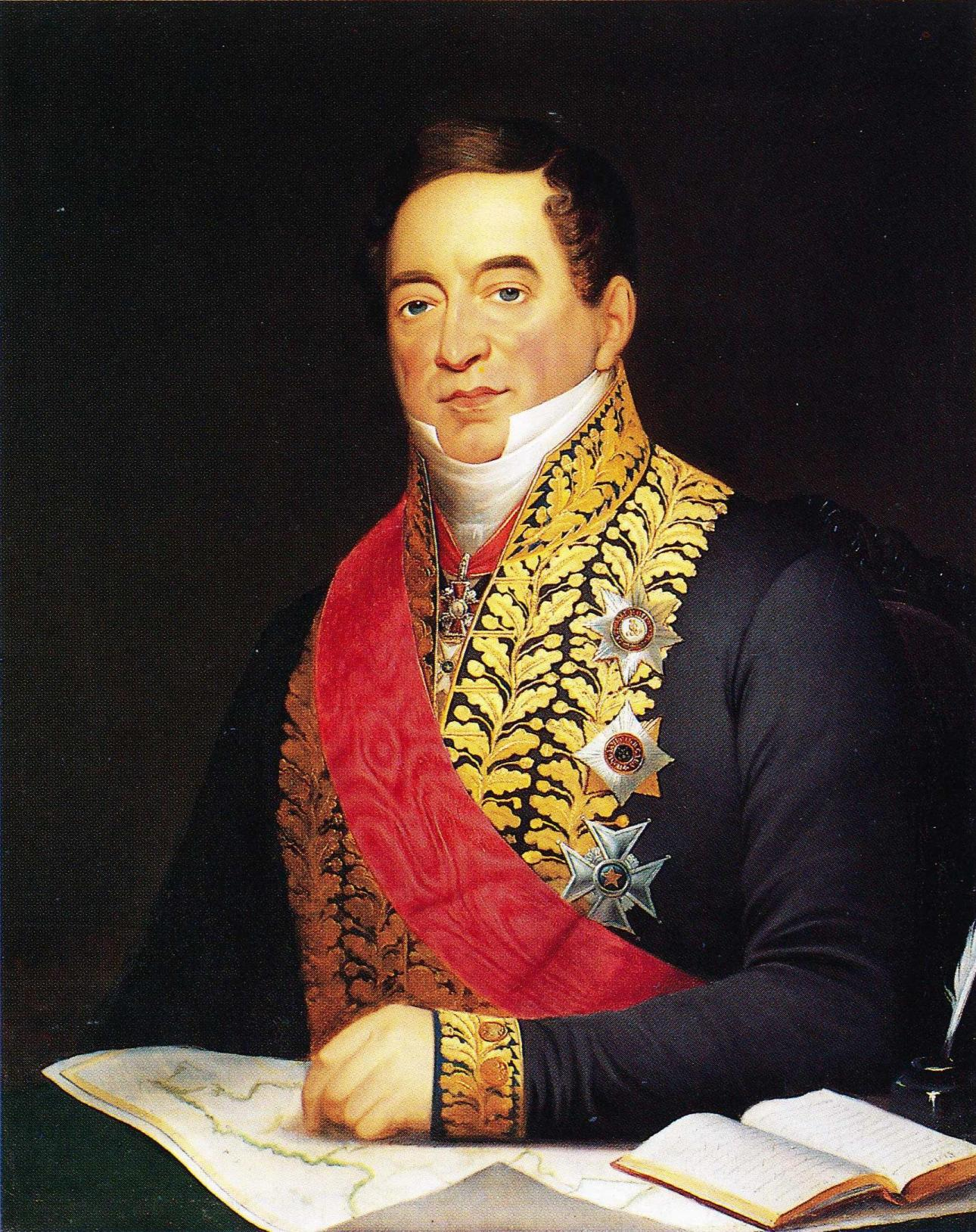
Robert Henrik Rehbinder

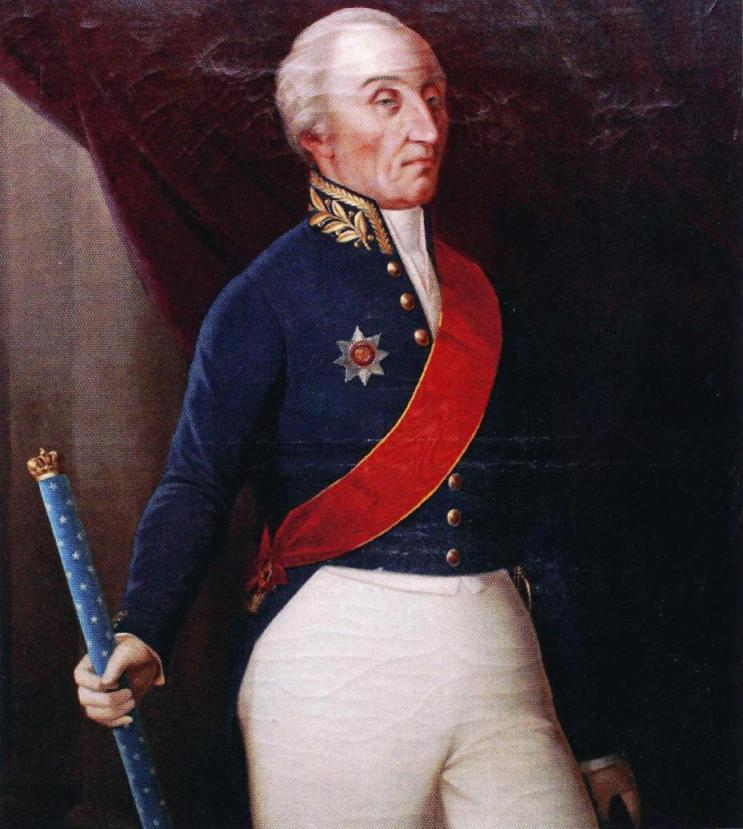
Robert Wilhelm De Geer, 1865

== See also ==
- Art in Finland

== Sources ==
- Ilmari Heikinheimo: Finland elämäkerrasto. Helsinki: Werner Söderström Corporation, 1955. Page 232
