= Vanemuine (god) =

Deity of songs in Estonian pseudo-mythology

Vanemuine (English: Eldermost) is a god of music in the artificial Estonian mythology created by Friedrich Robert Faehlmann and Friedrich Reinhold Kreutzwald. His name is probably derived from the Finnish Väinämöinen. Vanemuine is mentioned in the opening strophe of the epic Kalevipoeg by Kreutzwald.

In 1865, the Vanemuine Cultural Society was founded in Tartu, which evolved into the first Estonian-language theatre, Vanemuine, which remains Tartu's primary theatre.
