= Endla Theatre =

Theatre in Pärnu, Estonia

Coordinates: 58°23′6.95″N 24°29′48.12″E

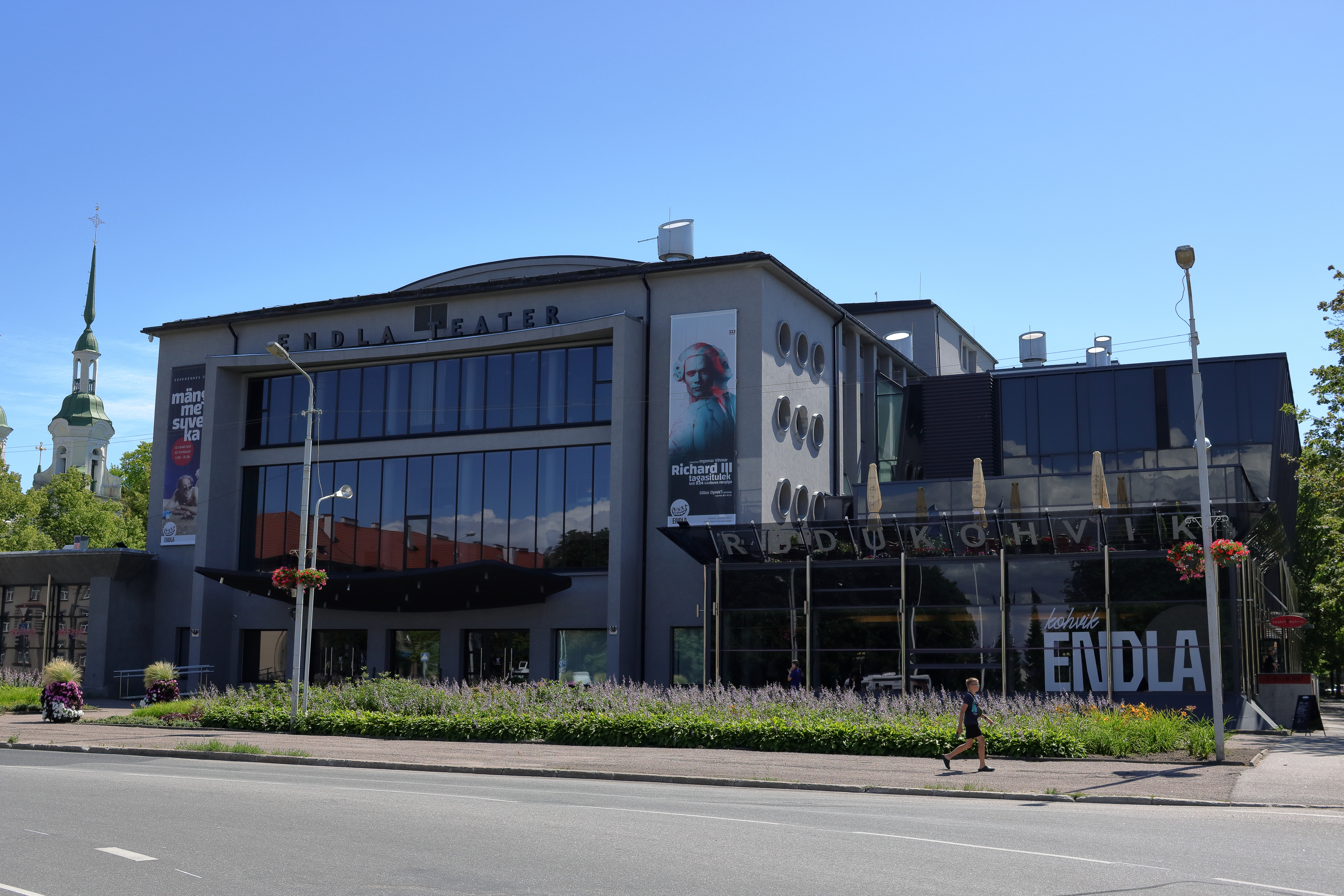
Endla Theatre

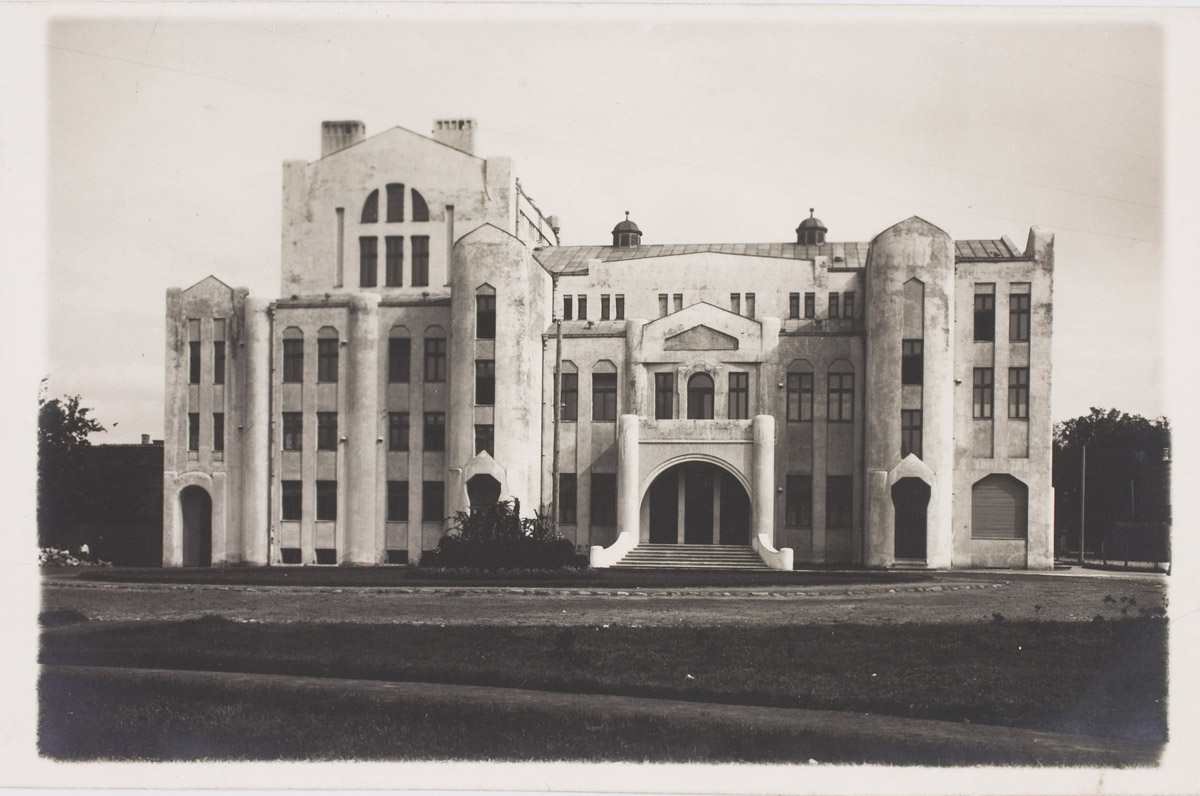
Original building

Endla (Estonian: Endla teater) is a professional theatre in city of Pärnu, Estonia.

The roots of the theatre came from Endla Society. The theatre opened in 1911. The first performance was Libahunt (The Werewolf) by the Estonian writer August Kitzberg. The Estonian Declaration of Independence was proclaimed from the theatre's balcony on 23 February 1918, one day before it was proclaimed in Tallinn. The theatre was destroyed by fire in 1944, and the Soviet authorities opted not to restore the theatre but to demolish it with explosives in 1961 due to it being an important symbol of Estonian independence. The new building was finished in 1967 and renovated in 2001.

== Notable members ==
From 1948 until 1986, the actress and singer Olli Ungvere was engaged at the theater. The actor Margus Oopkaup was a performer at the theater from 1982 until 2000. The actress Lii Tedre was engaged at the theater from 1968 until 2010 and has frequently returned to the Endla as a guest actress.

Jüri Vlassov worked with the theater from 1969 to 2014.

== See also ==
- Endla teater-seltsimaja Estonian Wikipedia article about the old building
- Endla teatrihoone Estonian Wikipedia article about the old building
