= Endla, Jõgeva County =

Village in Estonia

Endla
- Village
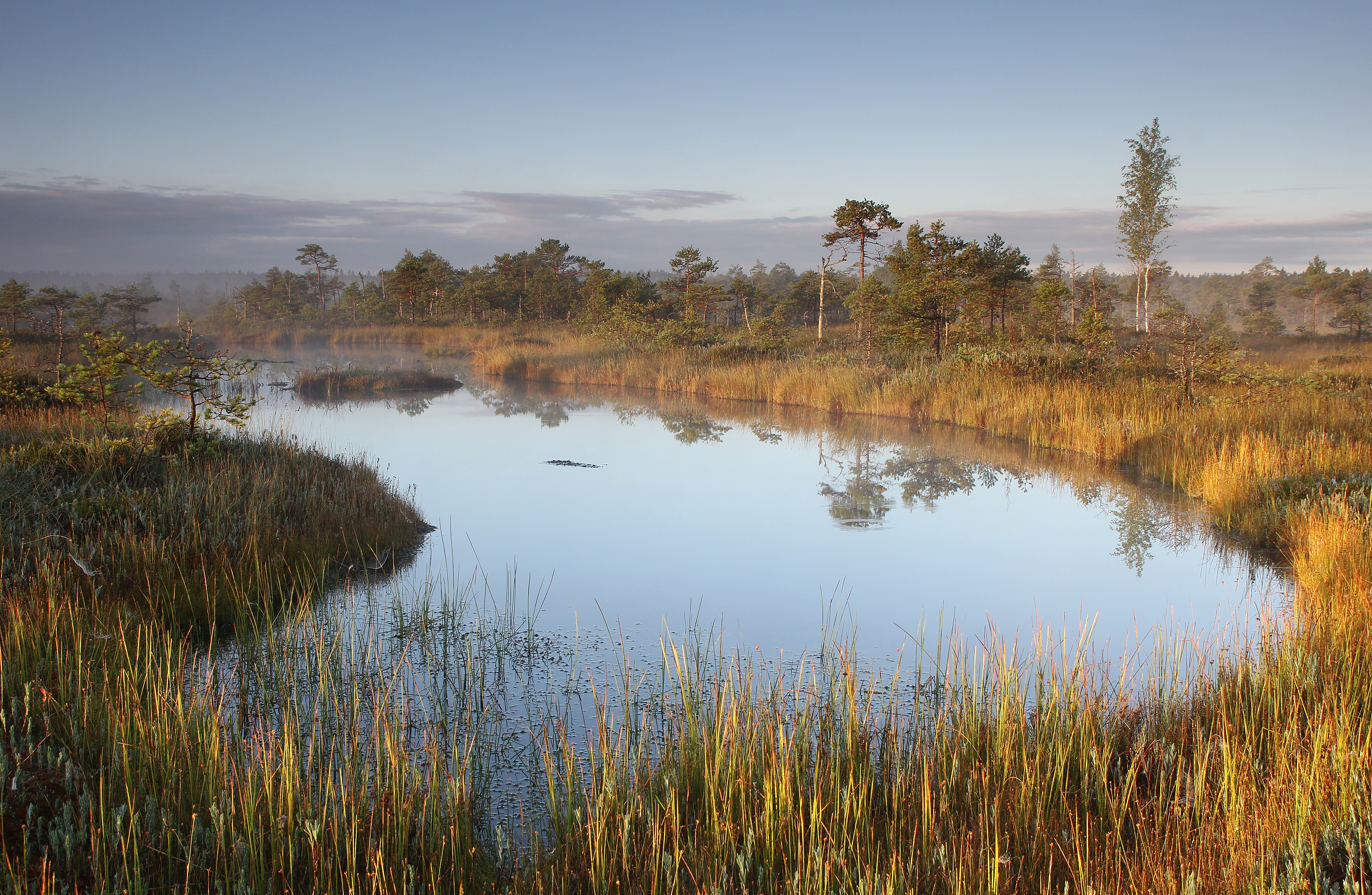
- Männikjärve Lake in Endla Nature Reserve

- Location within Estonia
- Coordinates: 58°49′27″N 26°13′38″E
- Country: Estonia
- County: Jõgeva County
- Parish: Jõgeva Parish
- Time zone: UTC+2 (EET)
  - Summer (DST): UTC+3 (EEST)

Endla is a village in Jõgeva Parish, Jõgeva County in eastern Estonia.
