= Endla (organization) =

Estonian cultural organization

Endla was an Estonian cultural organization, which based in Pärnu, Estonia.

The society was established in 1875 by the initiative of Carl Robert Jakobson. At the beginning, most of the members were choir singers. The society got his own house in 1911. This house was also the start of Endla Theatre.

The society was closed in 1940.

== See also ==
- Vanemuine Cultural Society
