= Vanemuine Cultural Society =

Estonian cultural organization

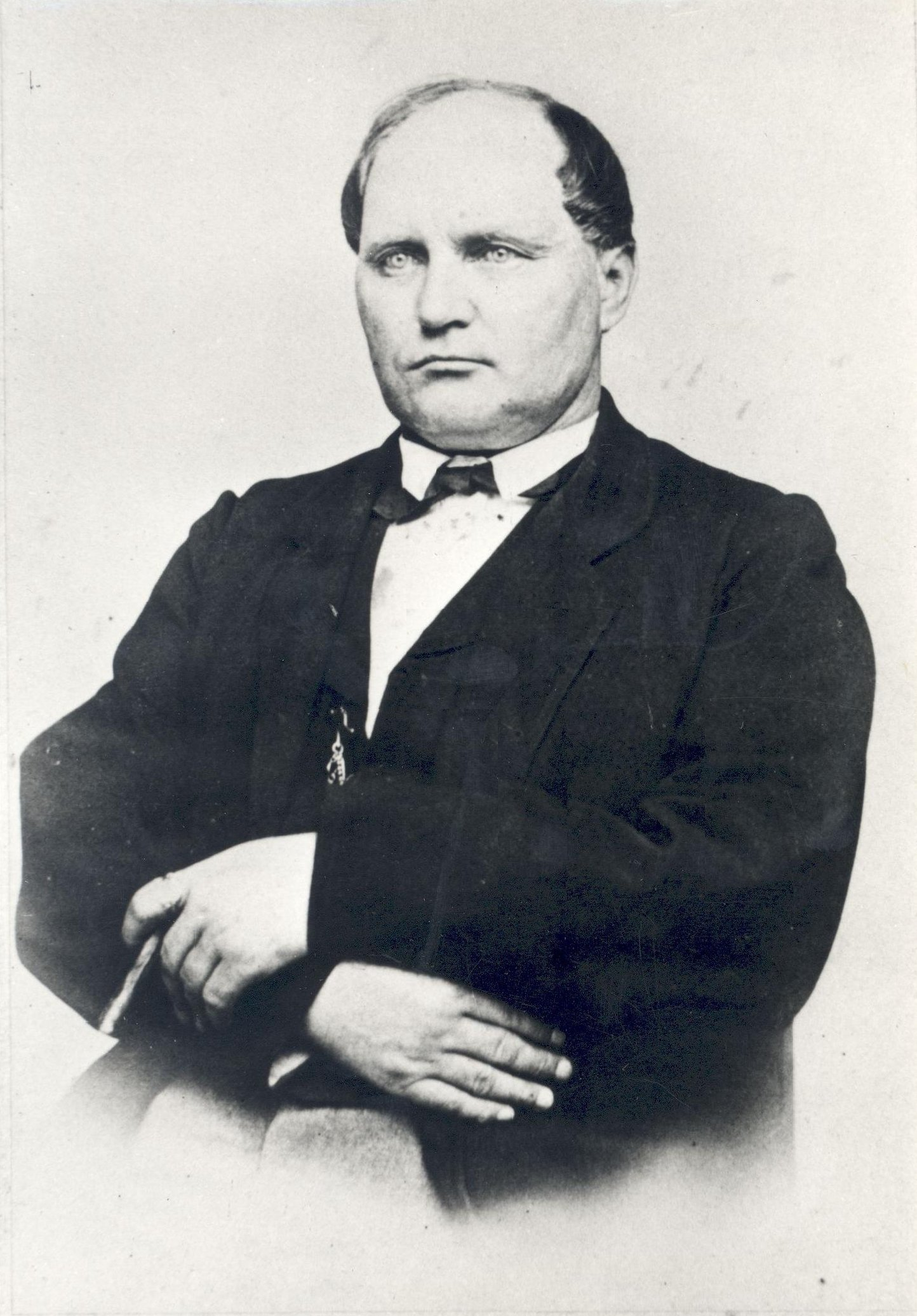
Johann Voldemar Jannsen, key person for the society

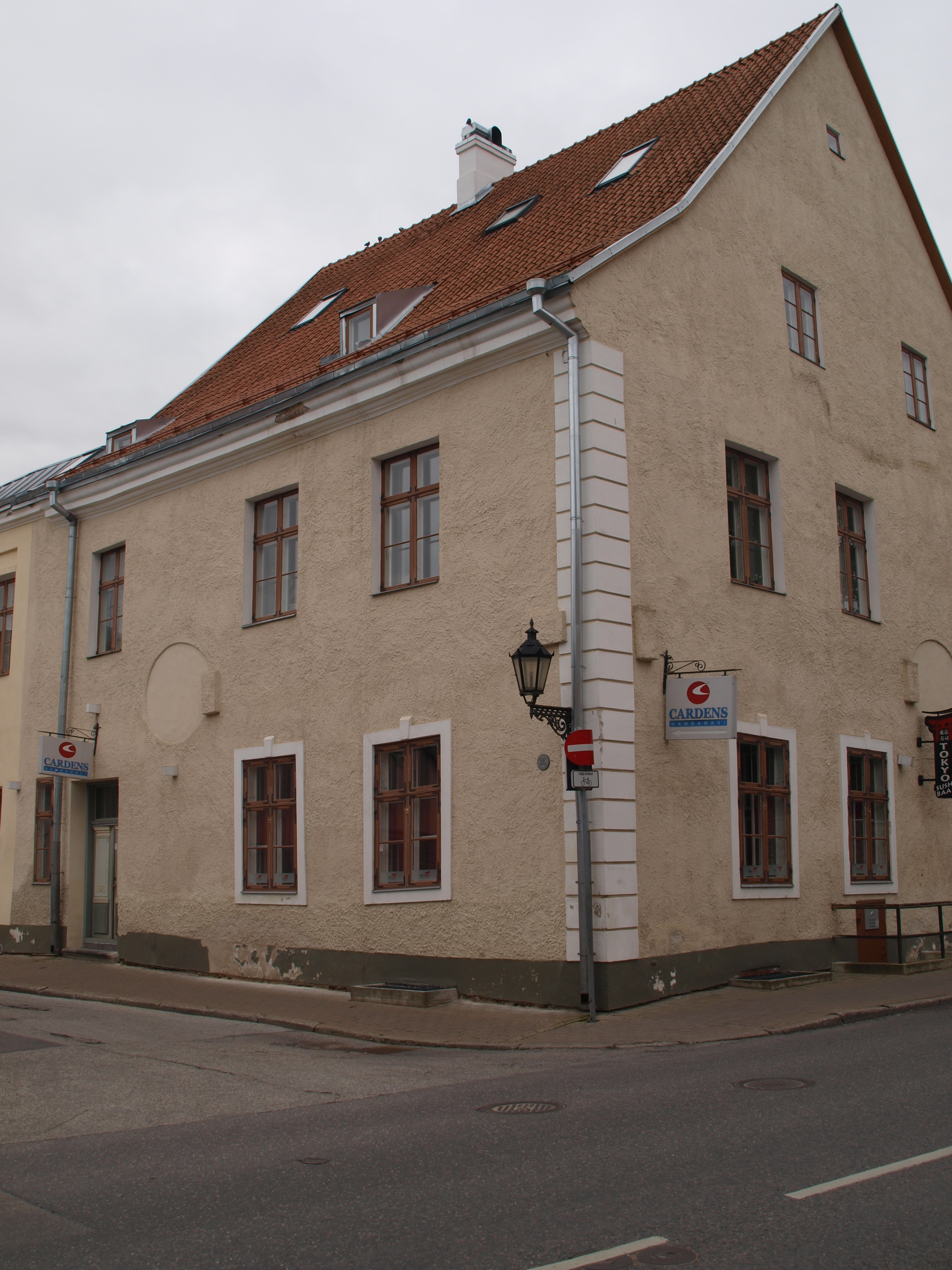
The house in Tartu (Jaani 20). The society used this house during 19th century

Vanemuine Cultural Society (Estonian: Vanemuine) is an Estonian cultural organization.

The society was established on 24 June 1865 by the initiative of Johann Voldemar Jannsen. At the beginning, the society focused on choir music.

In 1869, first Estonian Song Festival took place and the festival was organized by the society.

In 1870, first theatrical activities were taken place. These activities were the start of Estonian-language theatre.

In 1940, the society was closed.

In 1944, the society's buildings were destroyed due to military activity.

On 28 October 1994, the society re-established.

As of 2005, the society has 140 members.

== See also ==
- Endla (organization)
