= Messingåga =

River in Nordland, Norway

Messingåga (Norwegian) Siejphjohke (Southern Sami)
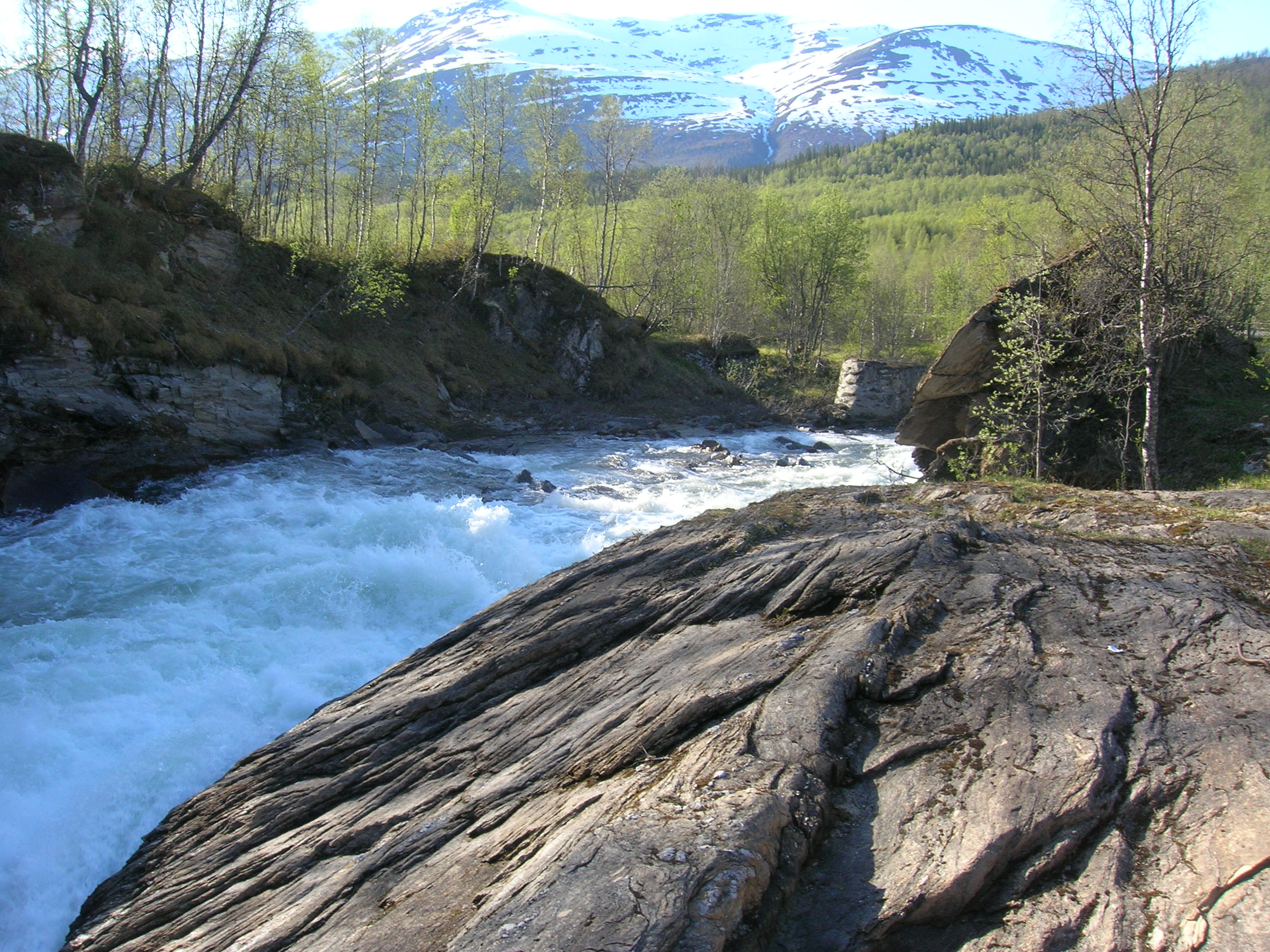
- Interactive map of the river

Location
- Country: Norway
- County: Nordland
- Municipalities: Rana Municipality

Physical characteristics
- Source: Elivollan
  - location: Rana Municipality, Norway
  - coordinates: 66.43579°N 14.9374°E
  - elevation: 592 metres (1,942 ft)
- Mouth: Ranelva
  - location: Rana Municipality, Norway
  - coordinates: 66.50329°N 14.93245°E
  - elevation: 315 metres (1,033 ft)
- Length: 8 km (5.0 mi)

Basin features
- River system: Ranelva

Messingåga (Norwegian) or Siejphjohke (Southern Sami) is a 8-kilometre (5.0 mi) long river which flows northwards, ending up as a tributary to the river Ranelva at Hjartåsen in the small village of Storvoll in the Dunderland Valley in Rana Municipality in Nordland county, Norway. The river should not be confused with the nearby stream, also named Messingåga, which flows into the river Ranelva from the east, just north of the village of Dunderland.

The river is located in an untouched natural area, in one of the most important areas of wetland birds in Rana Municipality. It is very rich with Arctic char and trout, and has been proposed to be preserved both by environmental organizations and by the Norwegian parliament.

== Path ==
From the small lake of Kjerringvatnet (Southern Sami: Stuorra Áhkajávri), the river Kjerringelva (Southern Sami: Áhkajohka) flows in an eastern direction. This river meets the stream Jarfjellbekken, which flows in a northern direction from the tarn Jarfjelltjønna through Austerskardet, north of the lake Kopparvatnet. Messingåga has its beginning at Elivollan (Southern Sami: Seaibbetgieddi), where the Kjerringelva and Jarfjellbekken meet.

The river flows in a northern direction, through the Messingdalen valley, east of the mountain Messingen. On its way northwards, the river absorbs (from the west) five brooks flowing from the mountain Jarfjellet, and (from the east) it also absorbs another five brooks from the mountain Kjerringfjellet and one brook from the mountain Harafjellet.

Messingåga flows through an area of moraines and deposits from glacial rivers. On its way to lake Kopparvatnet, it flows through an area of mounds and knots of moraines (kettle area).

== Power production ==
In 2005, the MiljøEnergi Nordland AS electric company delivered a formal application to the Norwegian Water Resources and Energy Directorate, in order to get a license to use parts of Messingåga to produce electricity. Two alternatives have been presented: One installation of 6.5 megawatts (8,700 hp) with an energy production of 19 gigawatt-hours (68 TJ), and another installation of 4.9 megawatts (6,600 hp) with an energy production of 16.5 gigawatt-hours (59 TJ).

== See also ==
- List of rivers in Norway
