= Ranelva =

River in Nordland, Norway

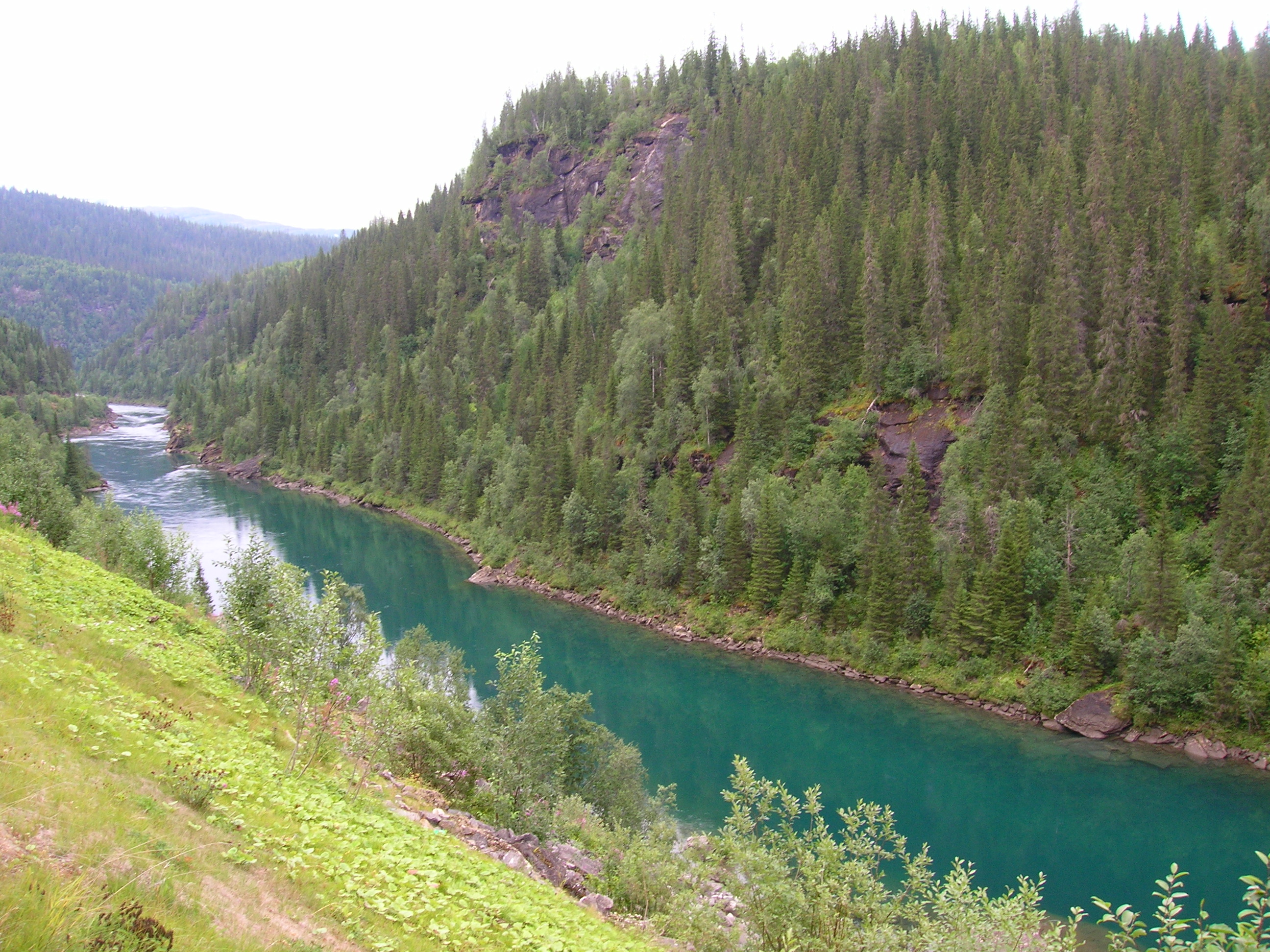
- Interactive map of the river

Location
- Country: Norway
- County: Nordland
- Municipalities: Rana Municipality

Physical characteristics
- Source: Saltfjellet
  - location: Rana Municipality, Norway
  - coordinates: 66°29′32″N 15°14′15″E
  - elevation: 540 metres (1,770 ft)
- Mouth: Ranfjorden
  - location: Mo i Rana, Norway
  - coordinates: 66°20′9″N 14°09′49″E
  - elevation: 0 metres (0 ft)
- Length: 130 km (81 mi)
- Basin size: 3,790 km^{2} (1,460 sq mi)

Ranelva is a 130-kilometre (81 mi) long river in Rana Municipality in Nordland county, Norway. It is one of the longest rivers in Nordland county. The catchment area of the river is 3,790 square kilometres (1,460 sq mi). Before the power stations of Reinforsen (1925) and Langvatnet (1964) were built, the catchment area was 3,843 square kilometres (1,484 sq mi).

== Path ==
The river begins on the Saltfjellet plateau, near the border between Norway and Sweden, at the confluence of the little rivers Randalselva (Southern Sami: Goabdesjåhkå) and Gubbeltåga (Lule Sami: Gubbeltædno). The river then flows mainly in a western-southwestern direction. On its way southwestwards, the river is joined by the river Virvasselva from south. The part of the Ranelva river between its beginning and its joining with Virvasselva is called Ruovadajåhkå in Lule Sami language.

Near Storvollen, the rivers Bjøllåga, Tespa, and Stormdalsåga all join Ranelva from the north and the river Messingåga joins from the south. It continues in a southwestern direction through the Dunderland Valley. The rivers Grønfjellåga and Plura join the Ranelva in this valley.

Southwest of the small village Røssvoll, Ranelva meets the river Langvassåga which empties the lake Langvatnet. Further down, at Selfors, the river Revelelva (the name of the lowest parts of the river Tverråga) joins the Ranelva. The river Ranelva empties into the Ranfjorden just south of Ytteren in Mo i Rana.

The river receives water from Storakersvatnet via Rana Hydroelectric Power Station.

== Fishing ==
Ranelva is a popular river for fishing. It is very rich with salmon and trout. One of the largest salmon tunnels in Norway (385 metres or 1,263 feet long) is located at the Reinforsen waterfall, and was built in 1956.

Ranelva was cleansed with rotenone in 1996, 2004, and 2005 beneath the Sjøforsen waterfall, in order to remove the salmon parasite Gyrodactylus salaris, which was registered there for the first time in 1975.

== Media gallery ==
=== Storvoll ===
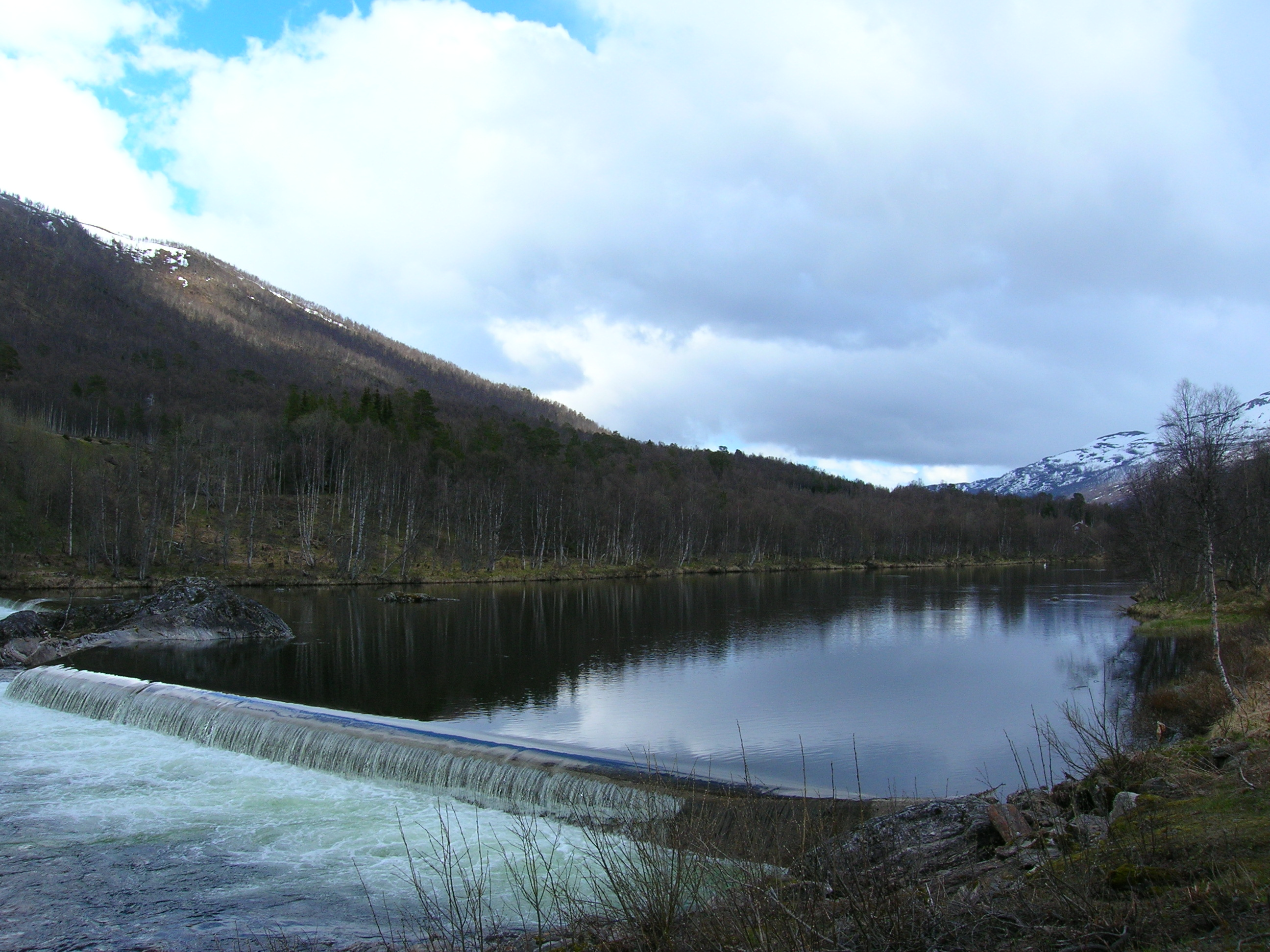

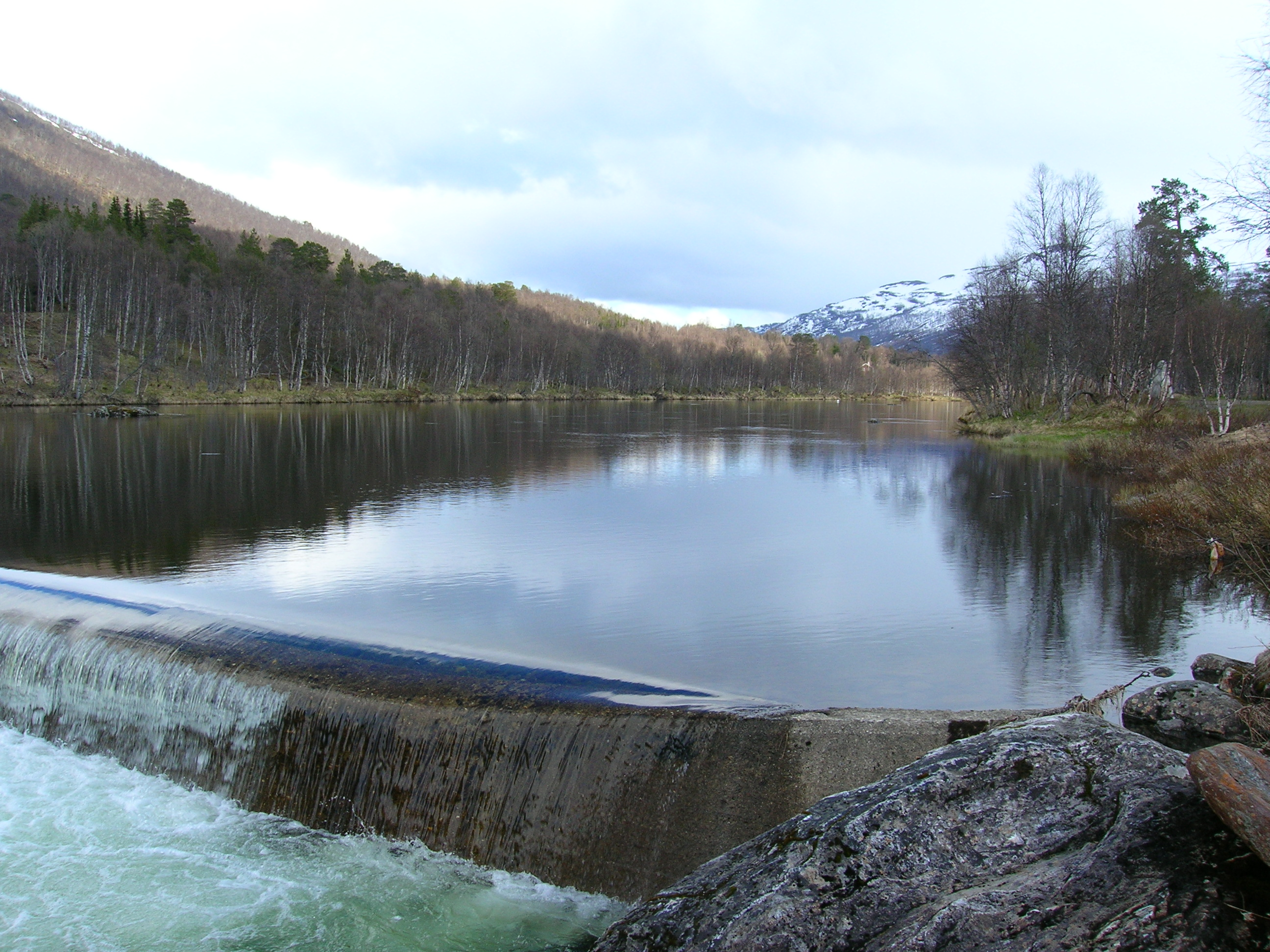

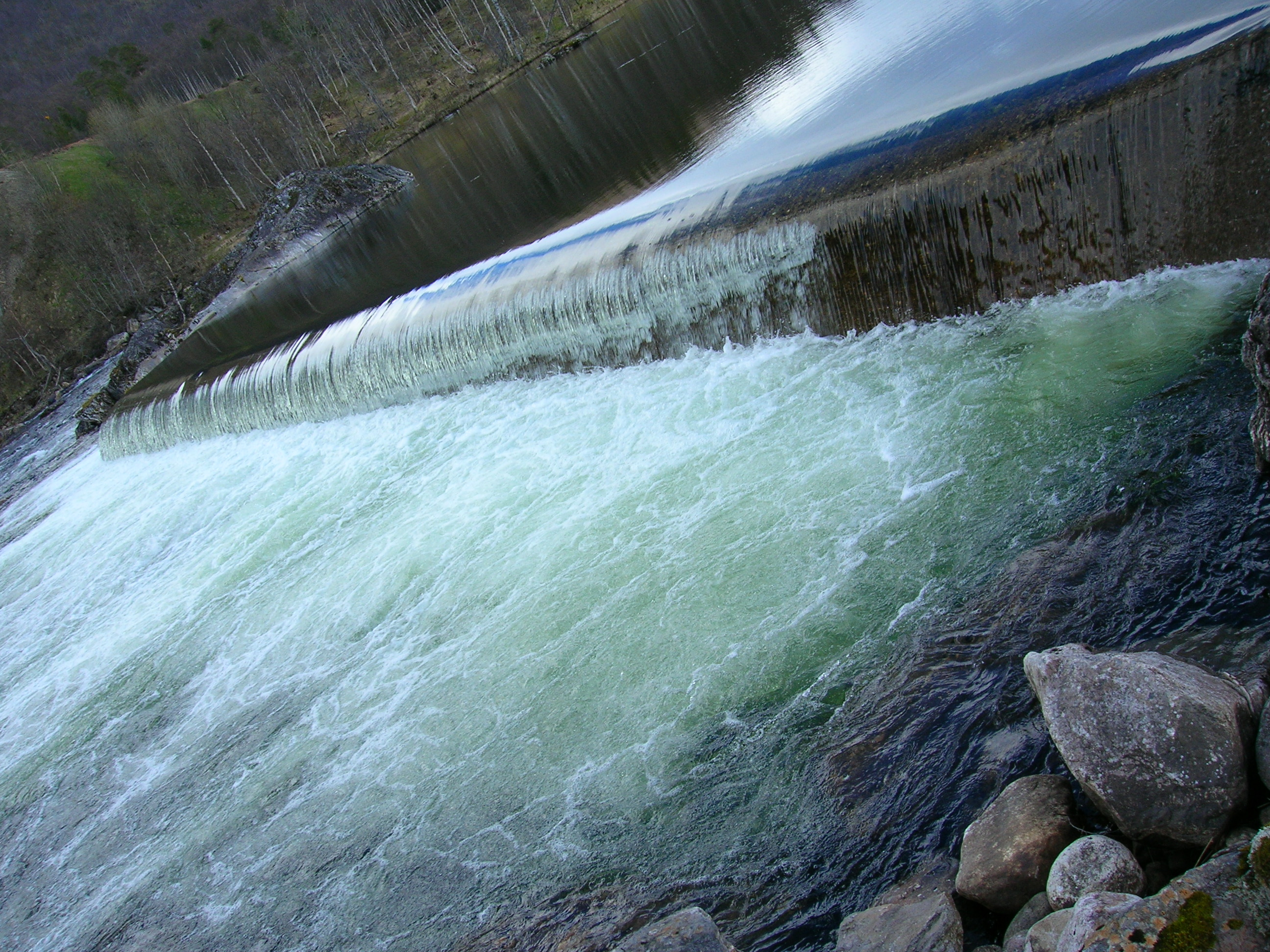

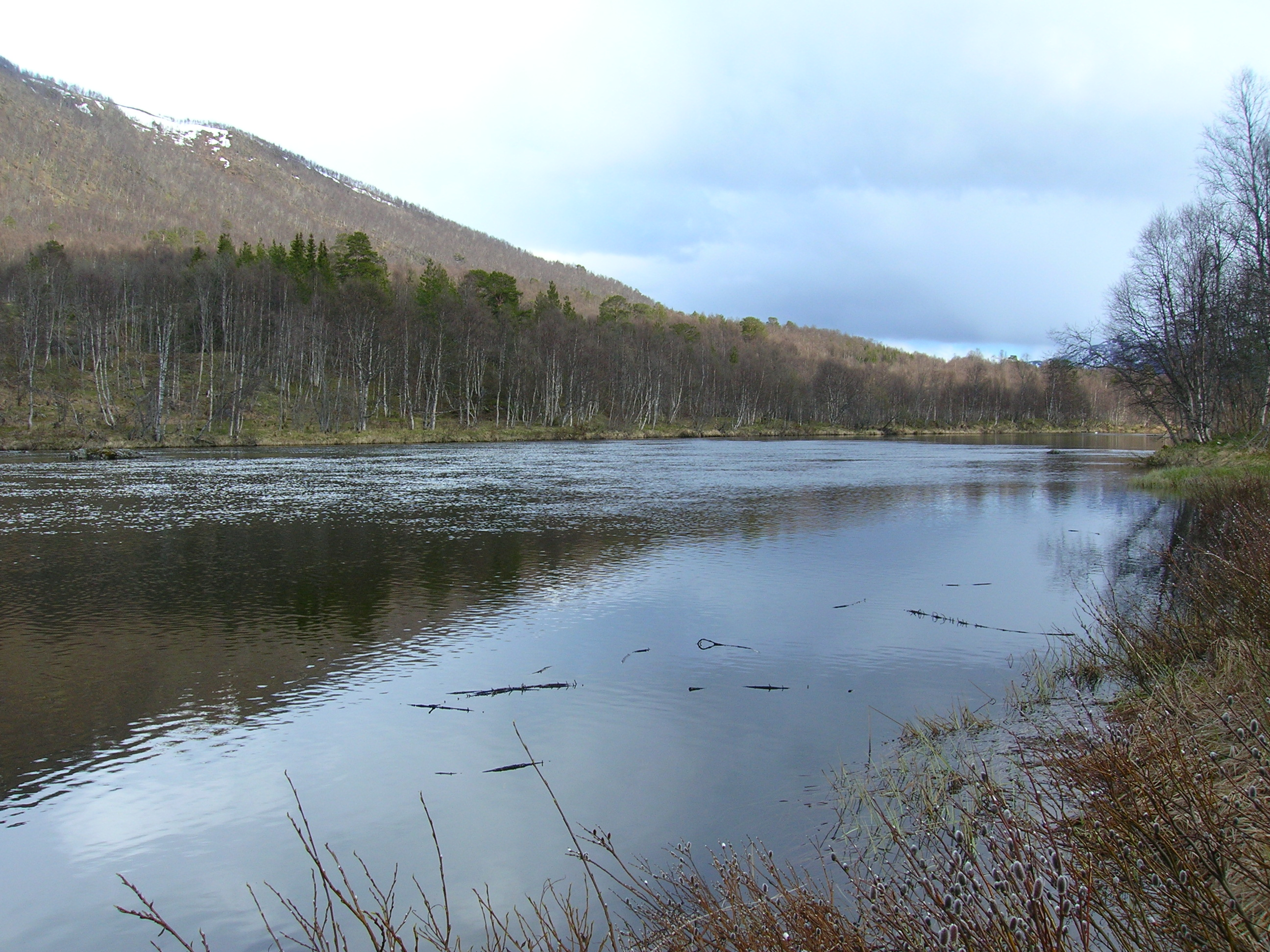

=== Illhøllia ===
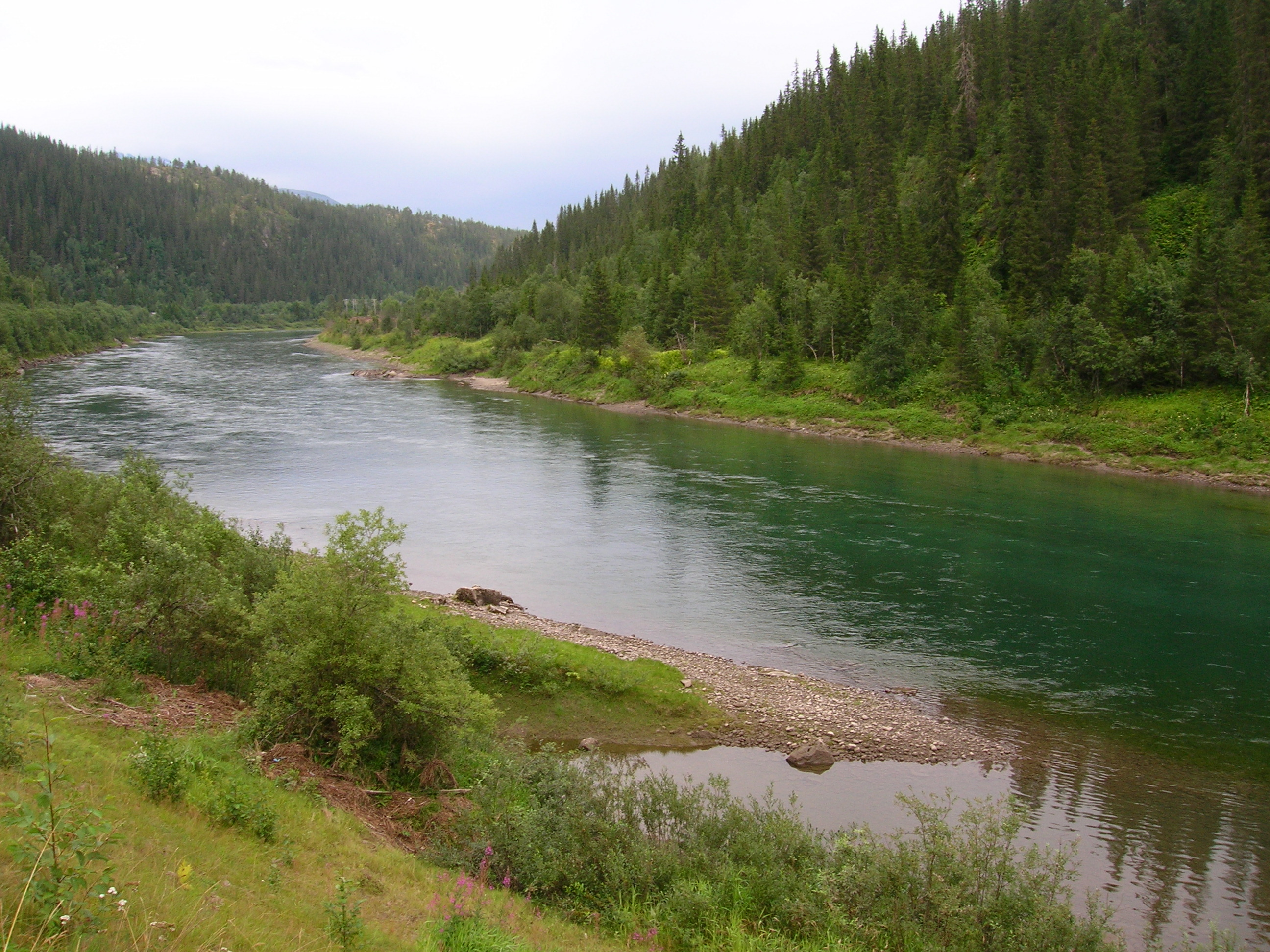

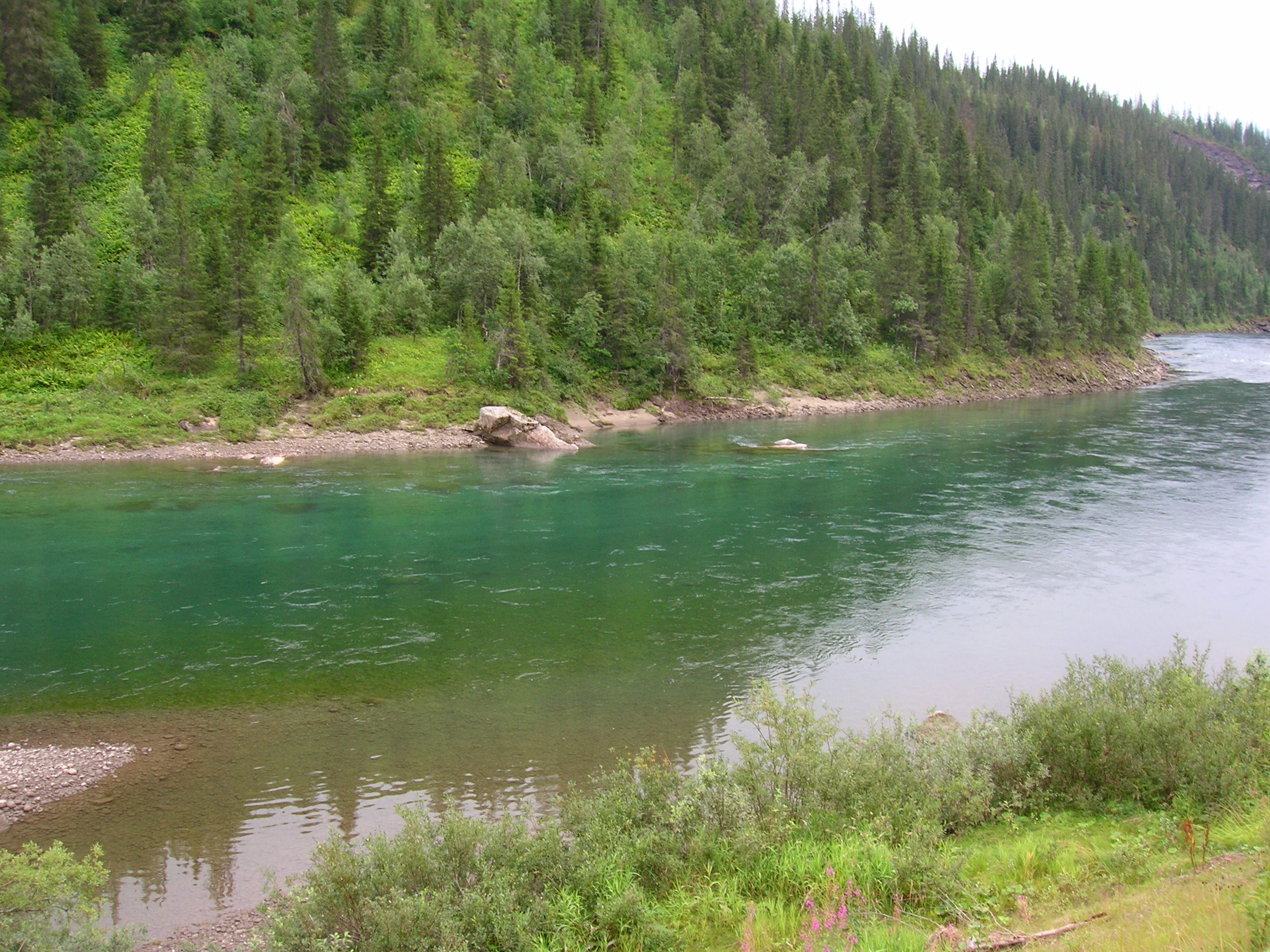

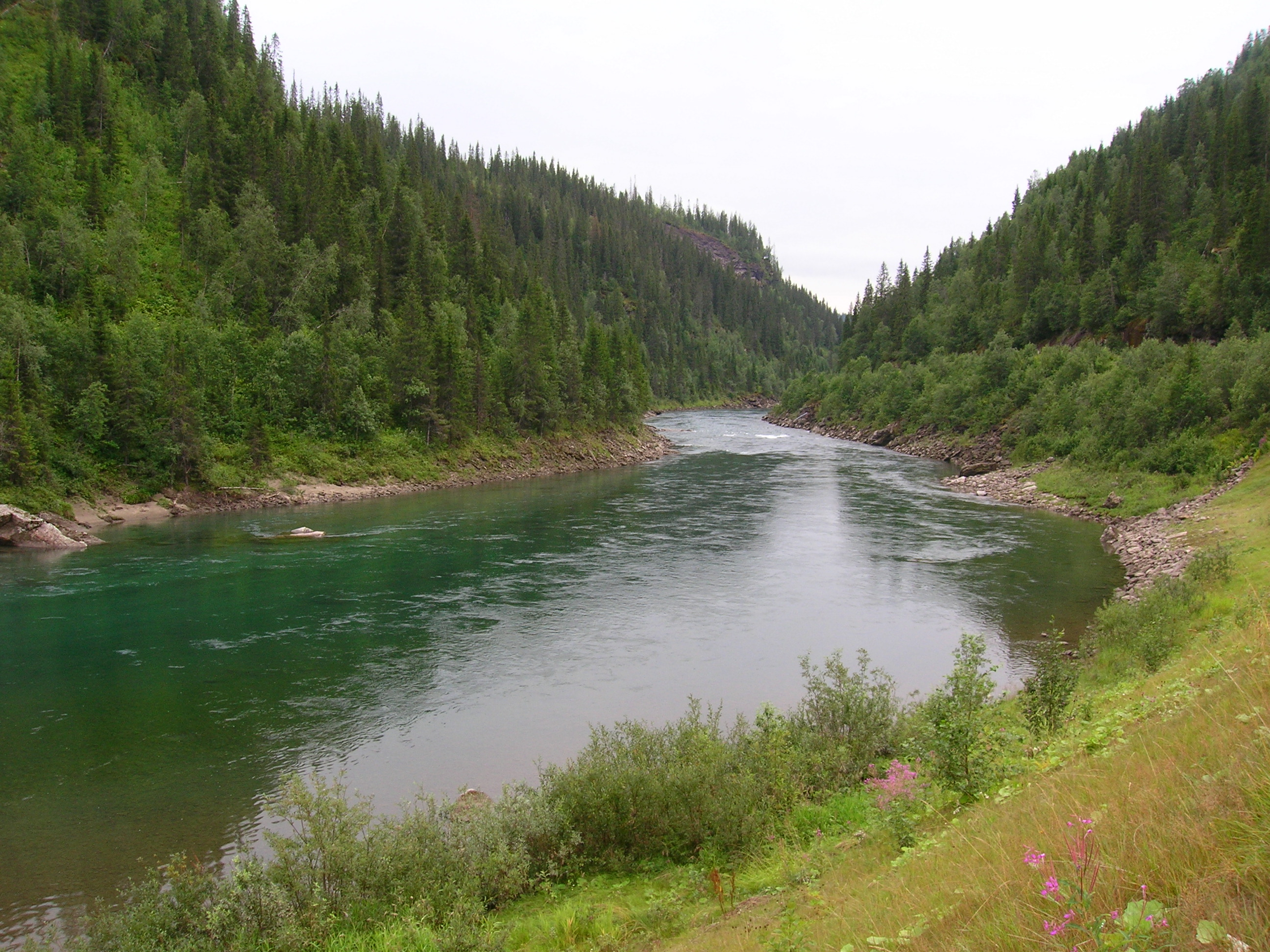

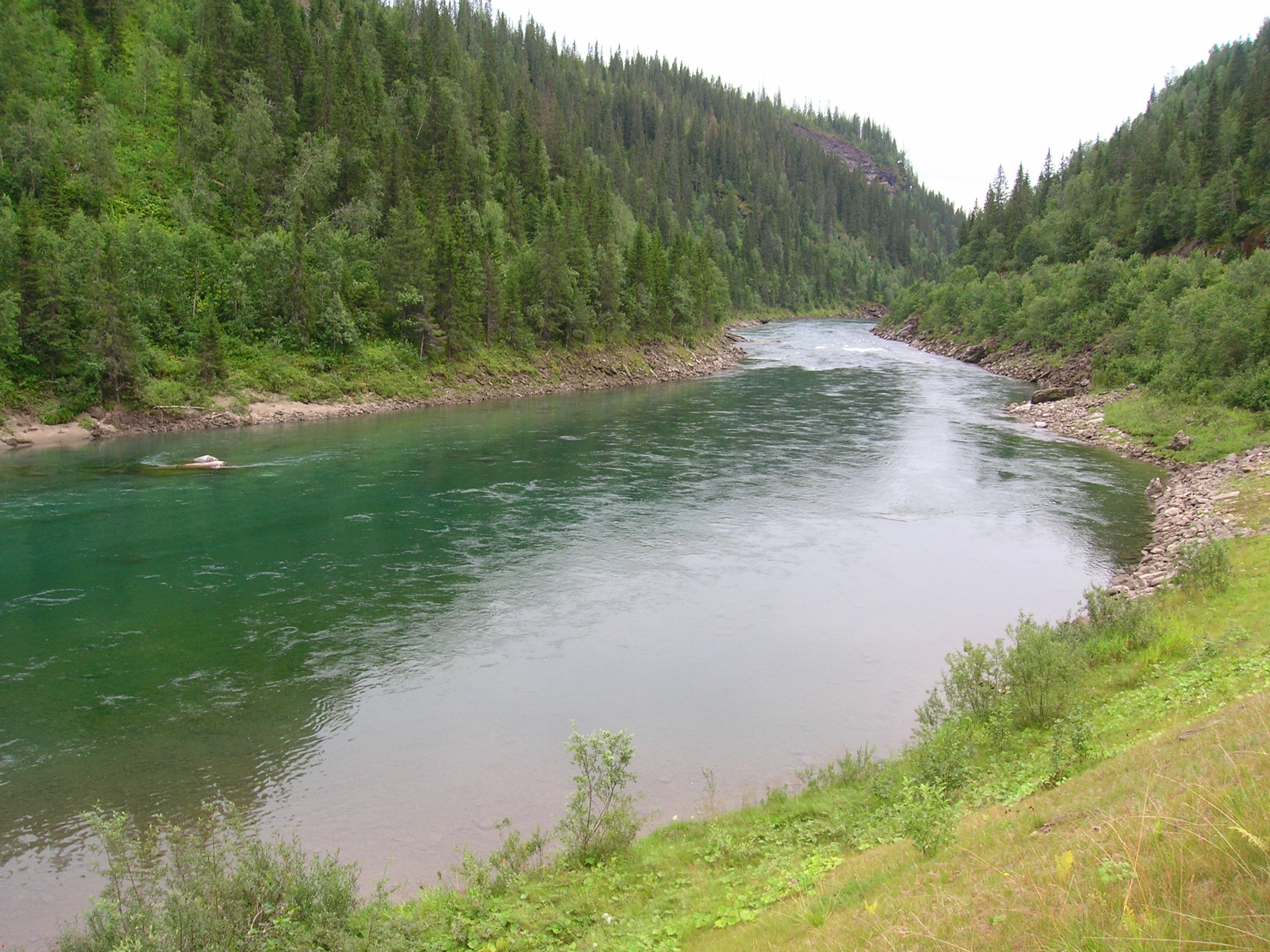

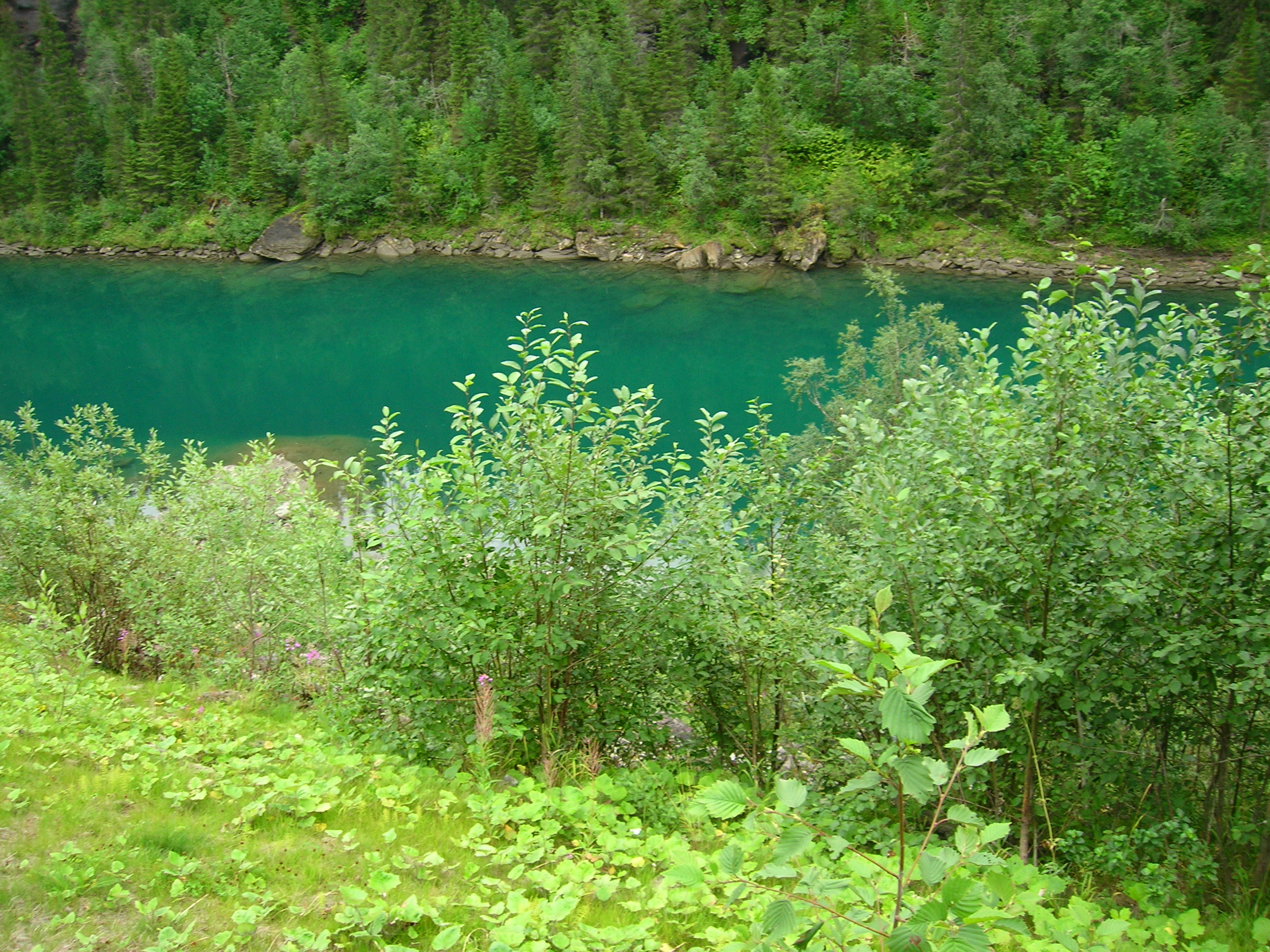

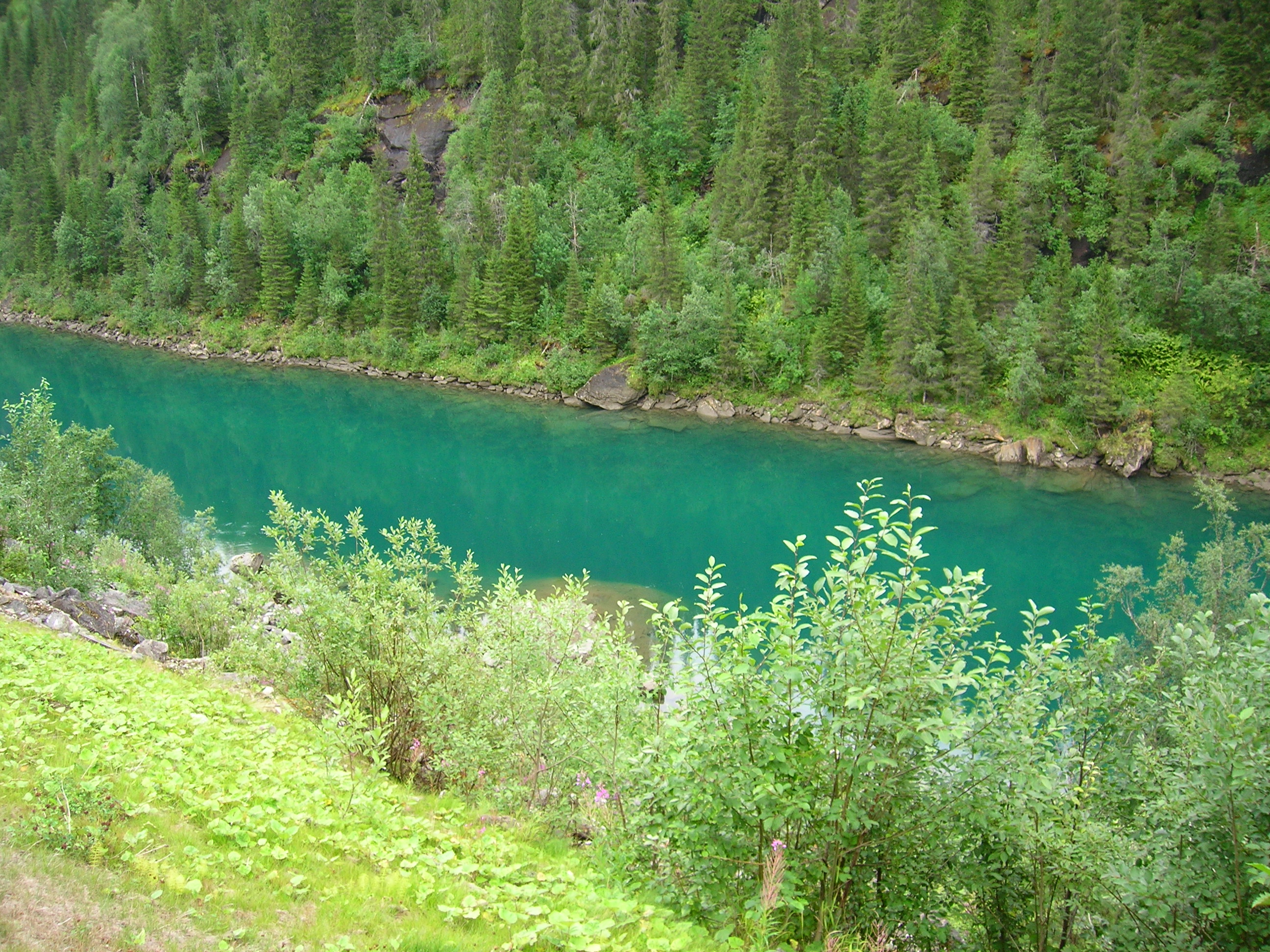

=== Reinforsen ("Reindeer waterfall") ===
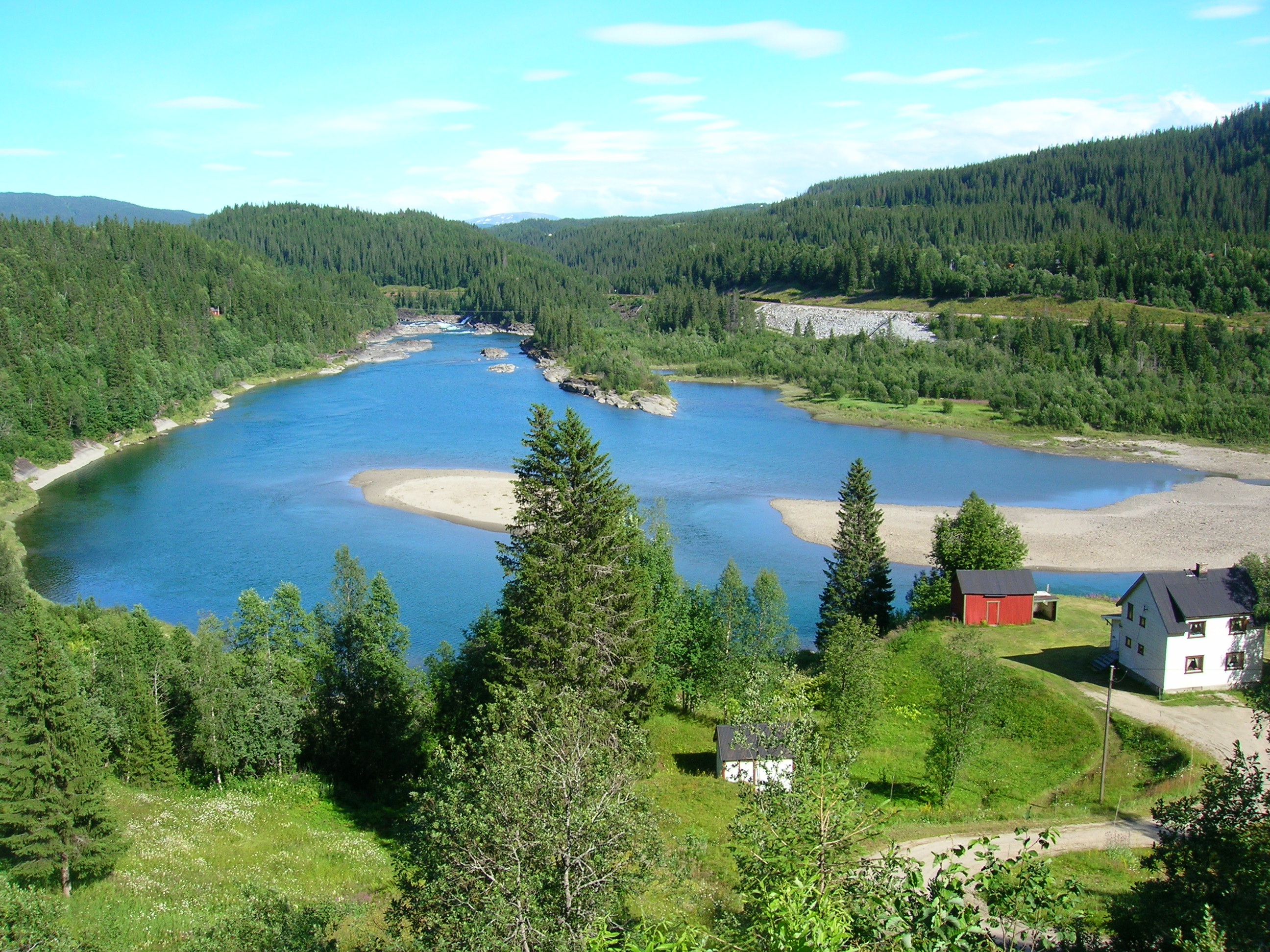
Seen from European route 6, south of Reinforsen

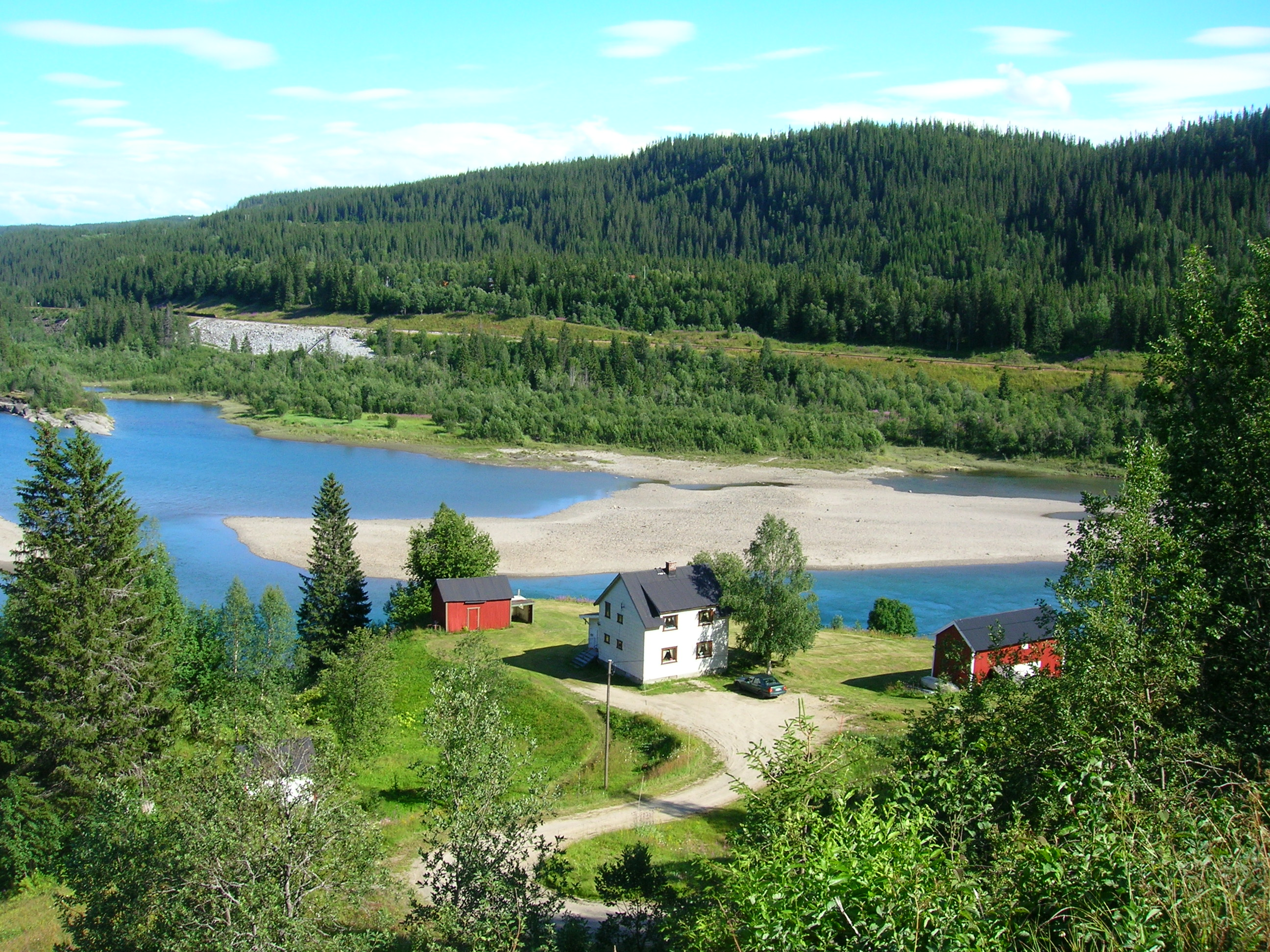
Seen from European route 6, south of Reinforsen

=== Selfors ===
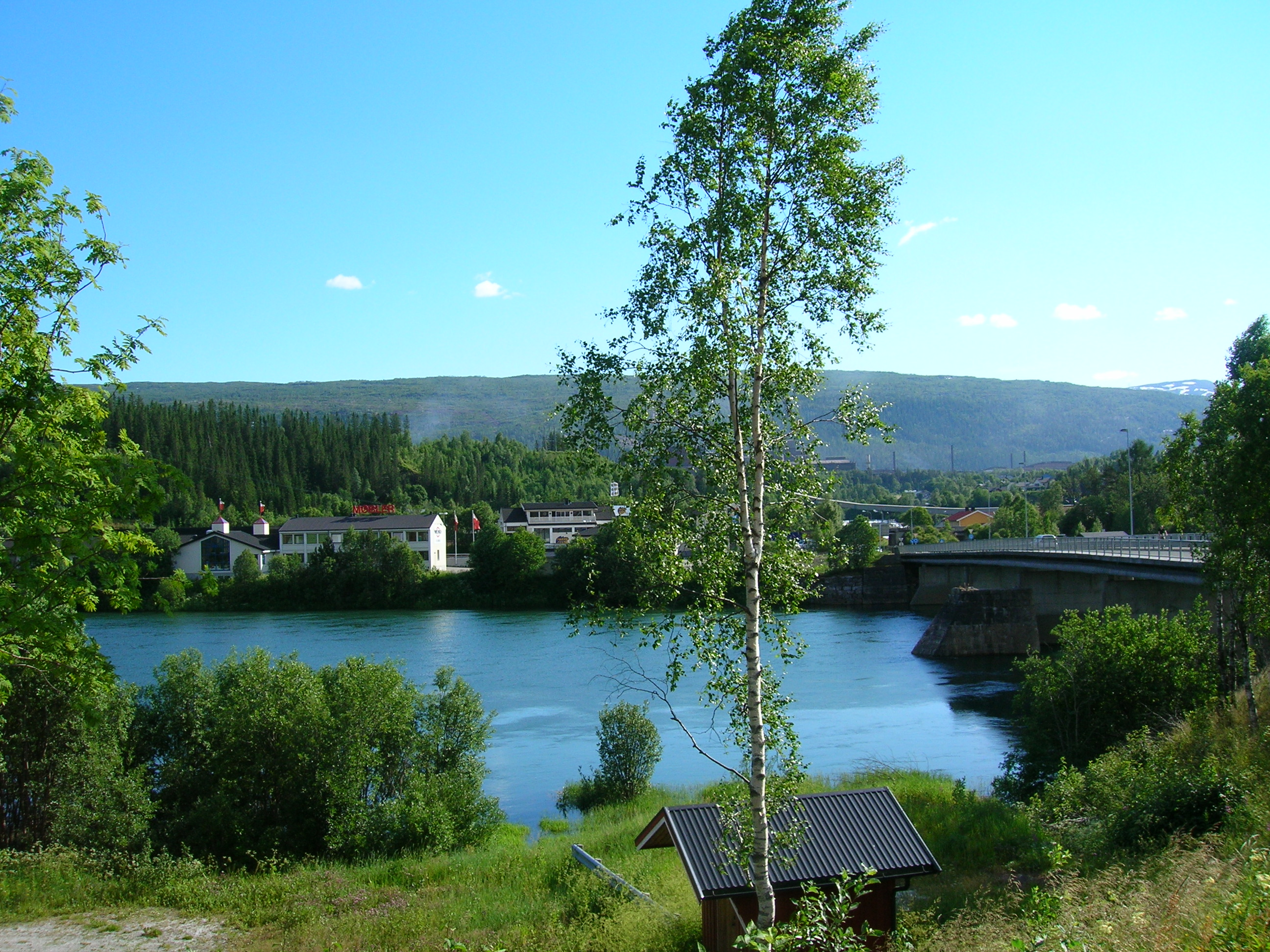
Ranelva and the bridge on Selfors on the right

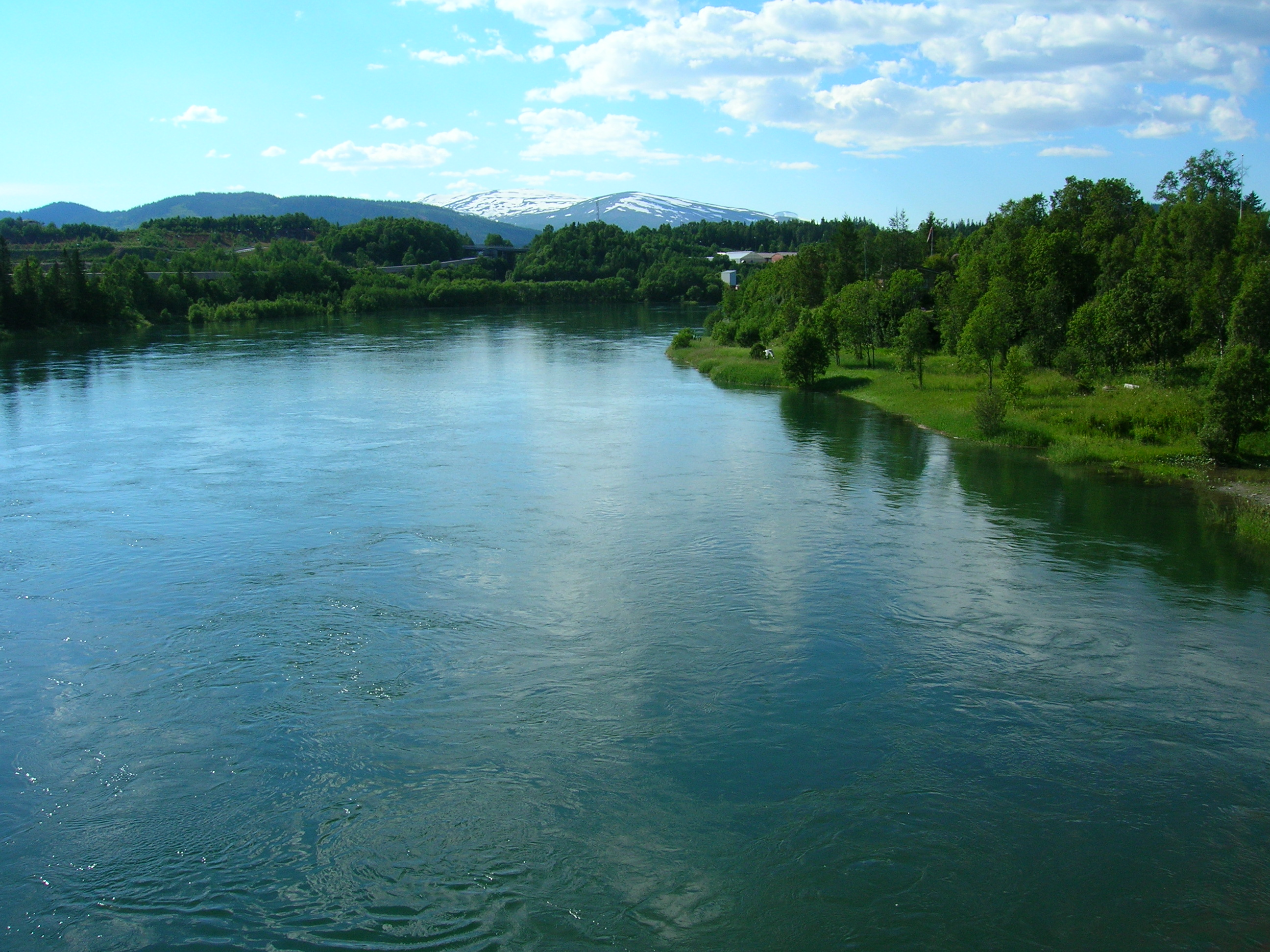
Ranelva seen from Selfors bridge in the direction of its outlet into Ranfjord

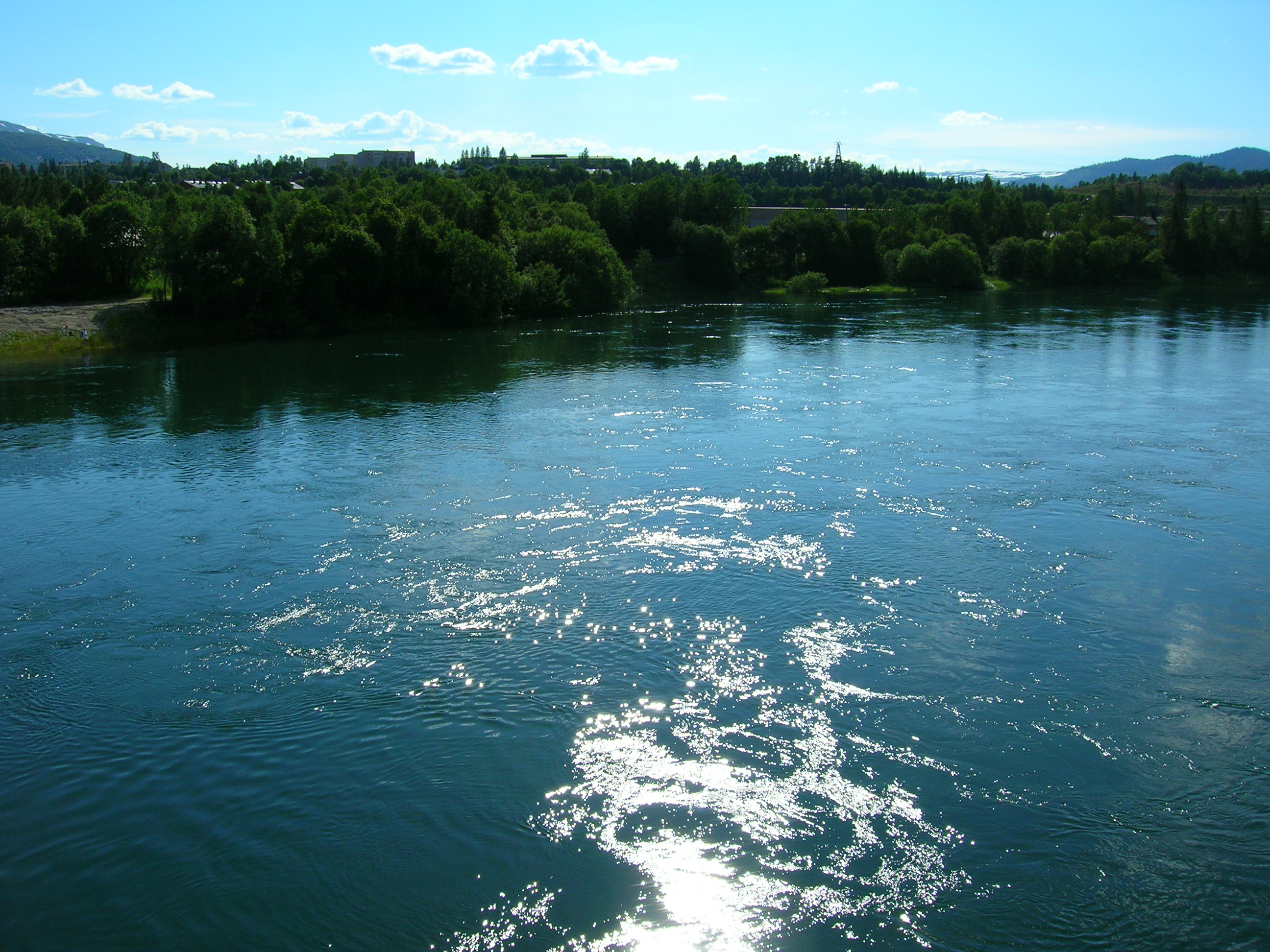
Ranelva seen from Selfors bridge in the direction of its outlet into Ranfjord

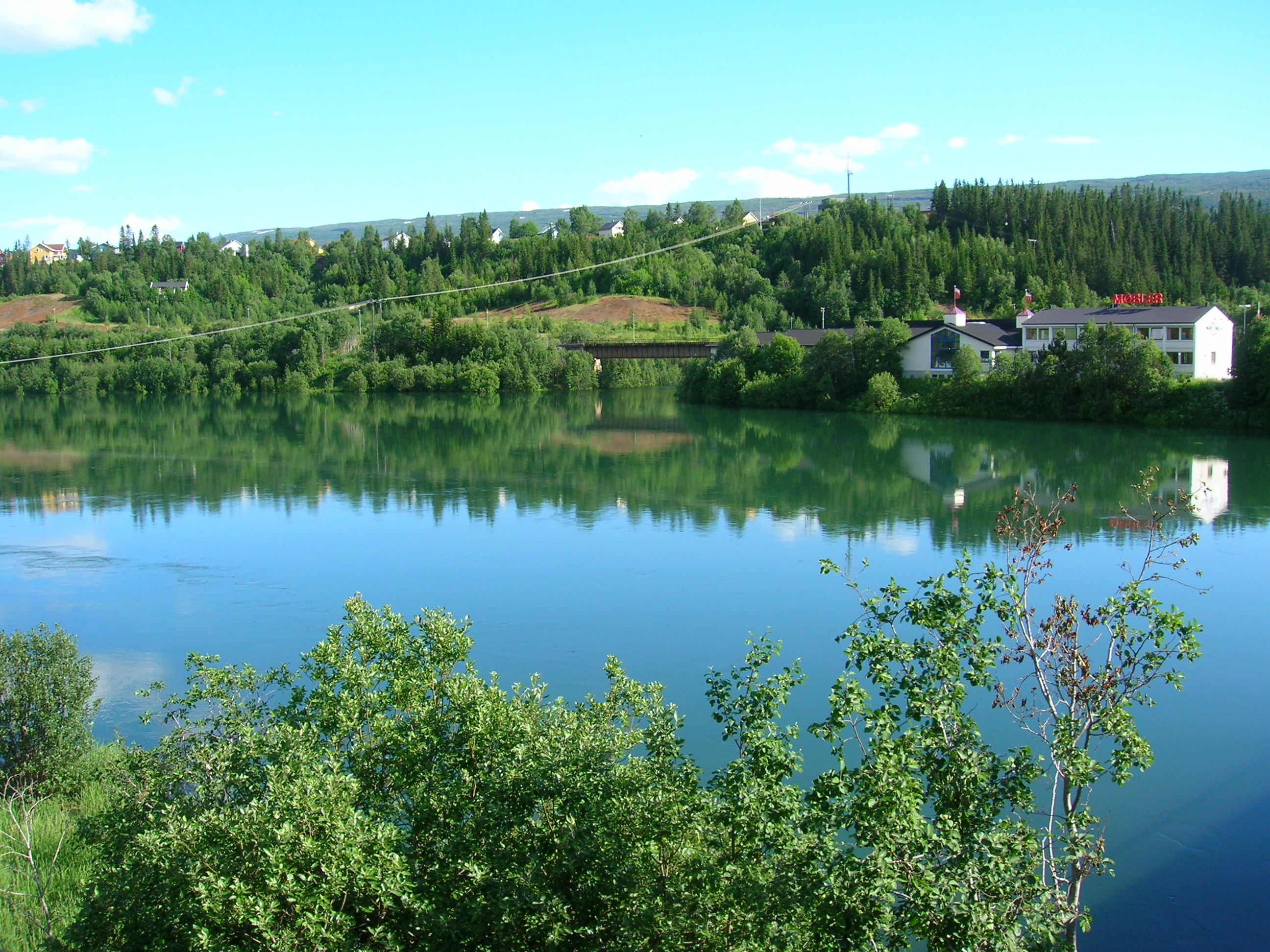
Ranelva seen from Selfors bridge. The outlet of Revelelva is also seen

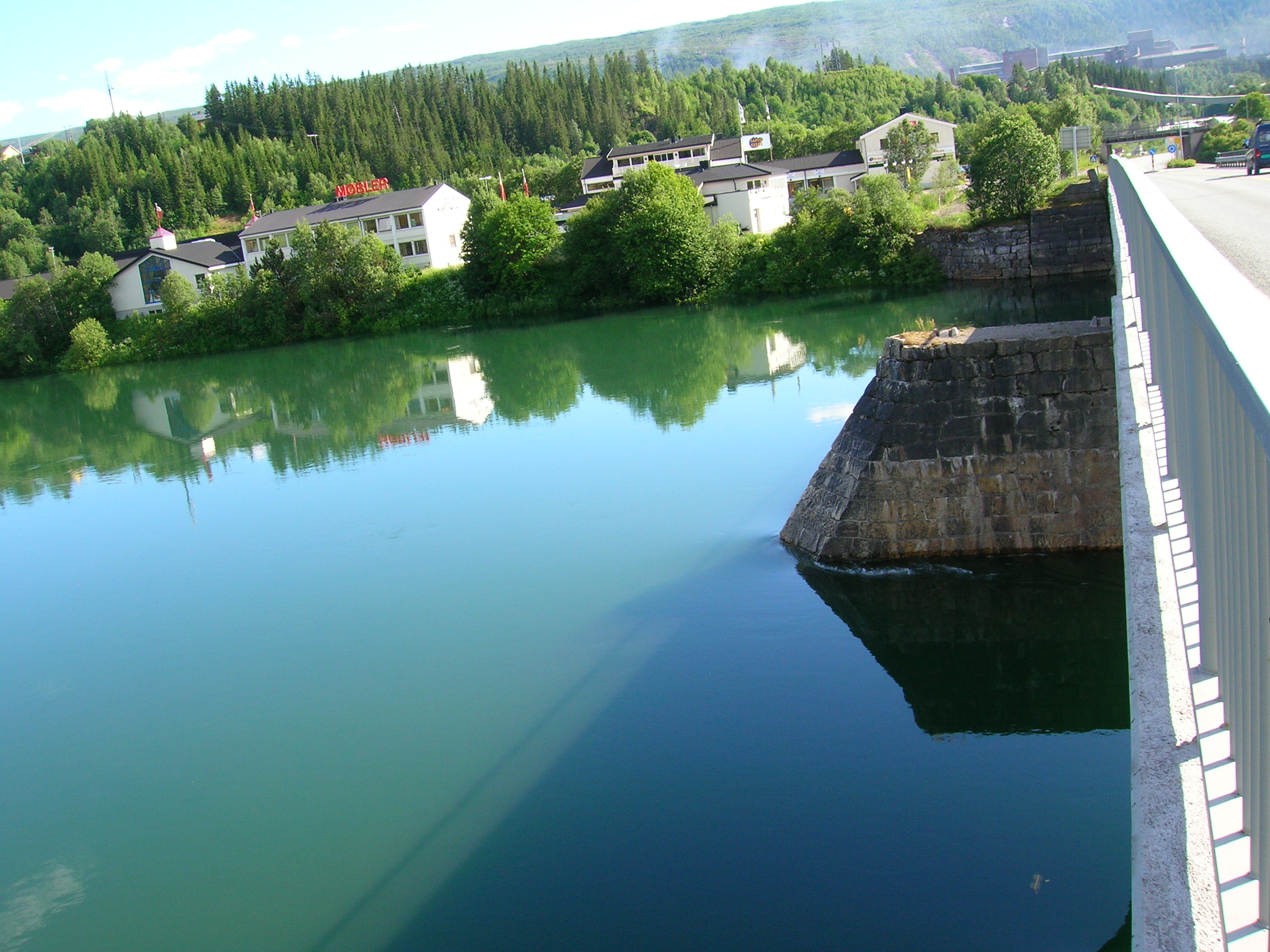
Ranelva seen from Selfors bridge

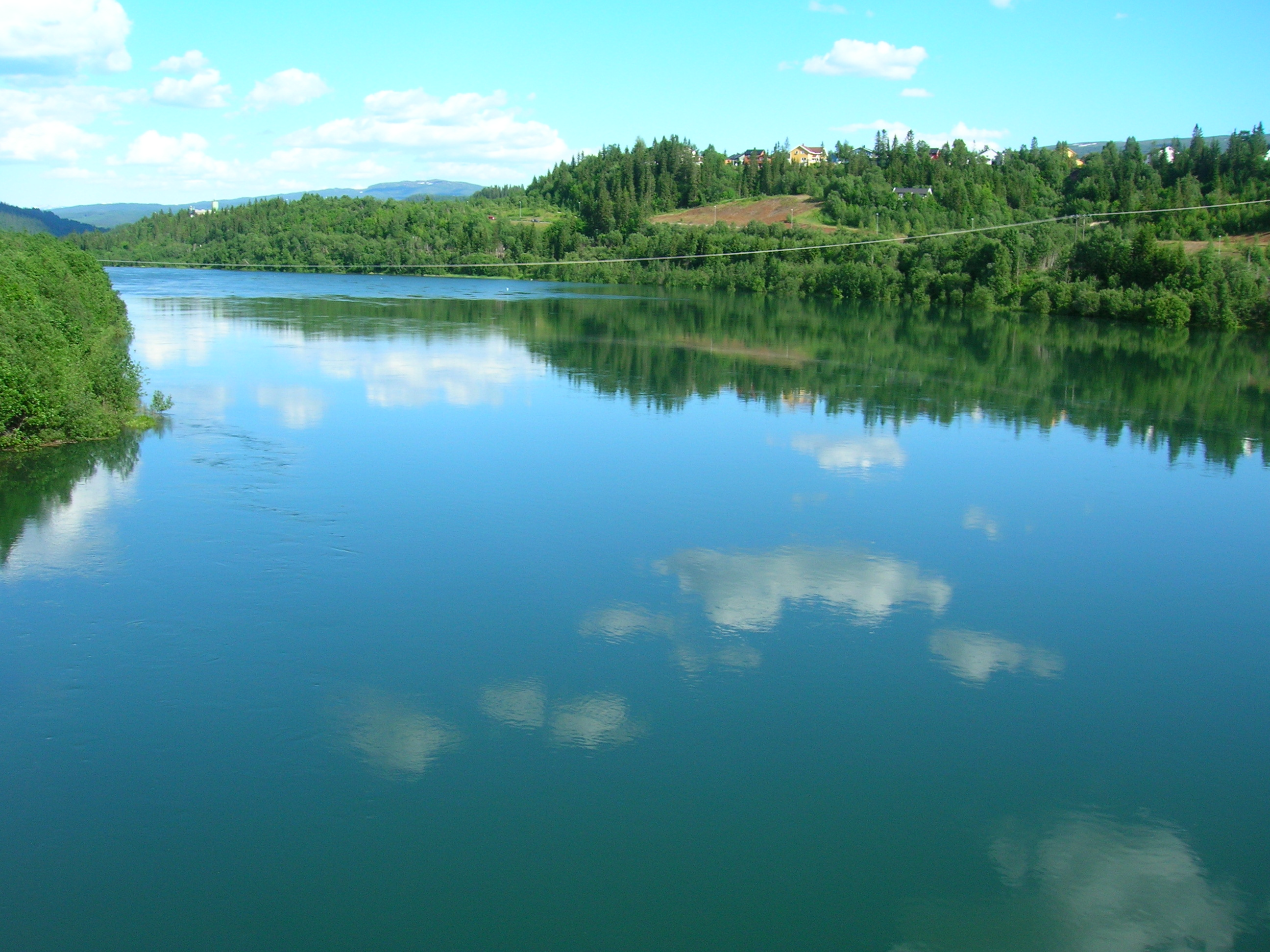
Ranelva seen from Selfors bridge

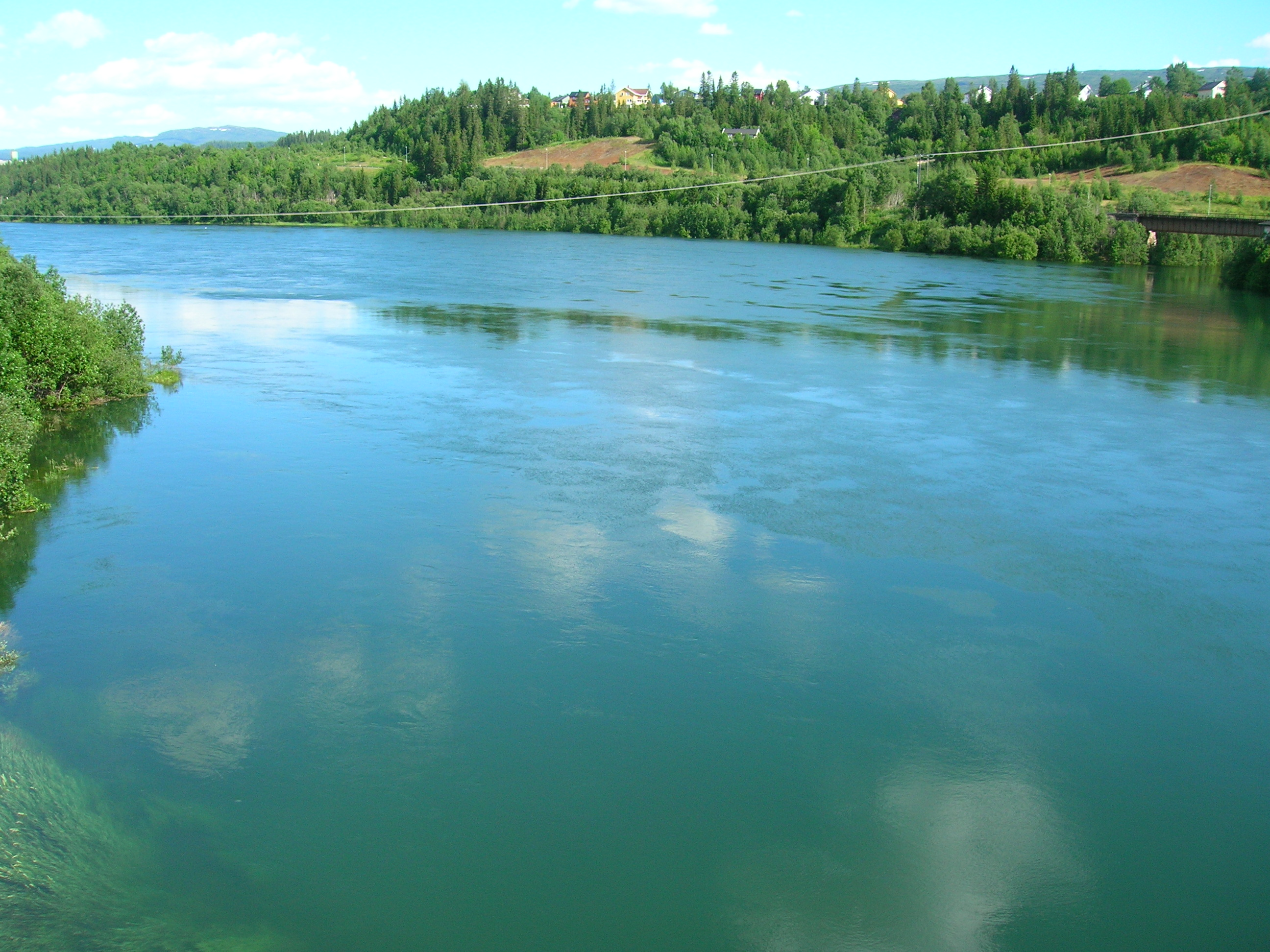
Ranelva seen from Selfors bridge

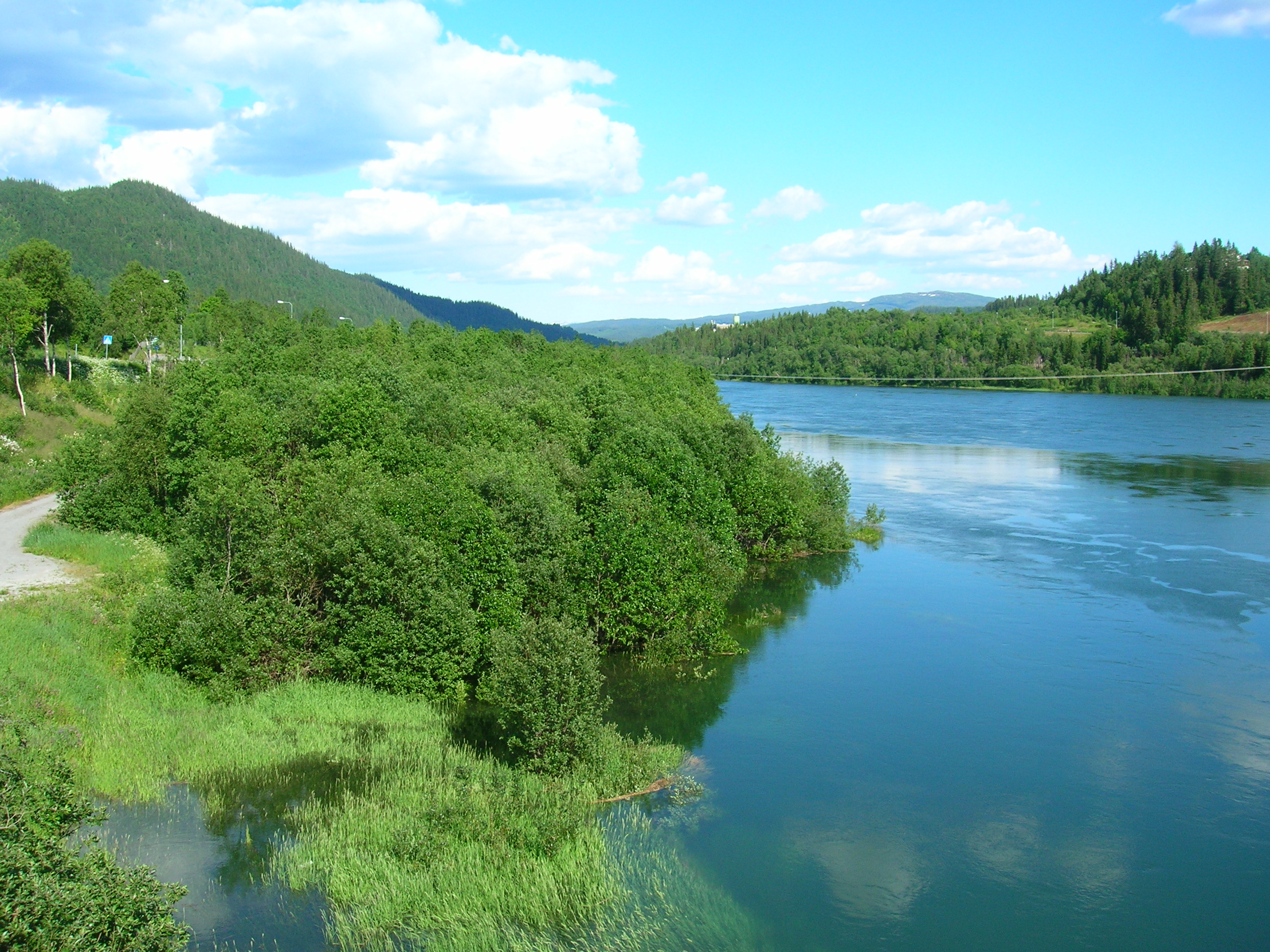
Ranelva seen from Selfors bridge

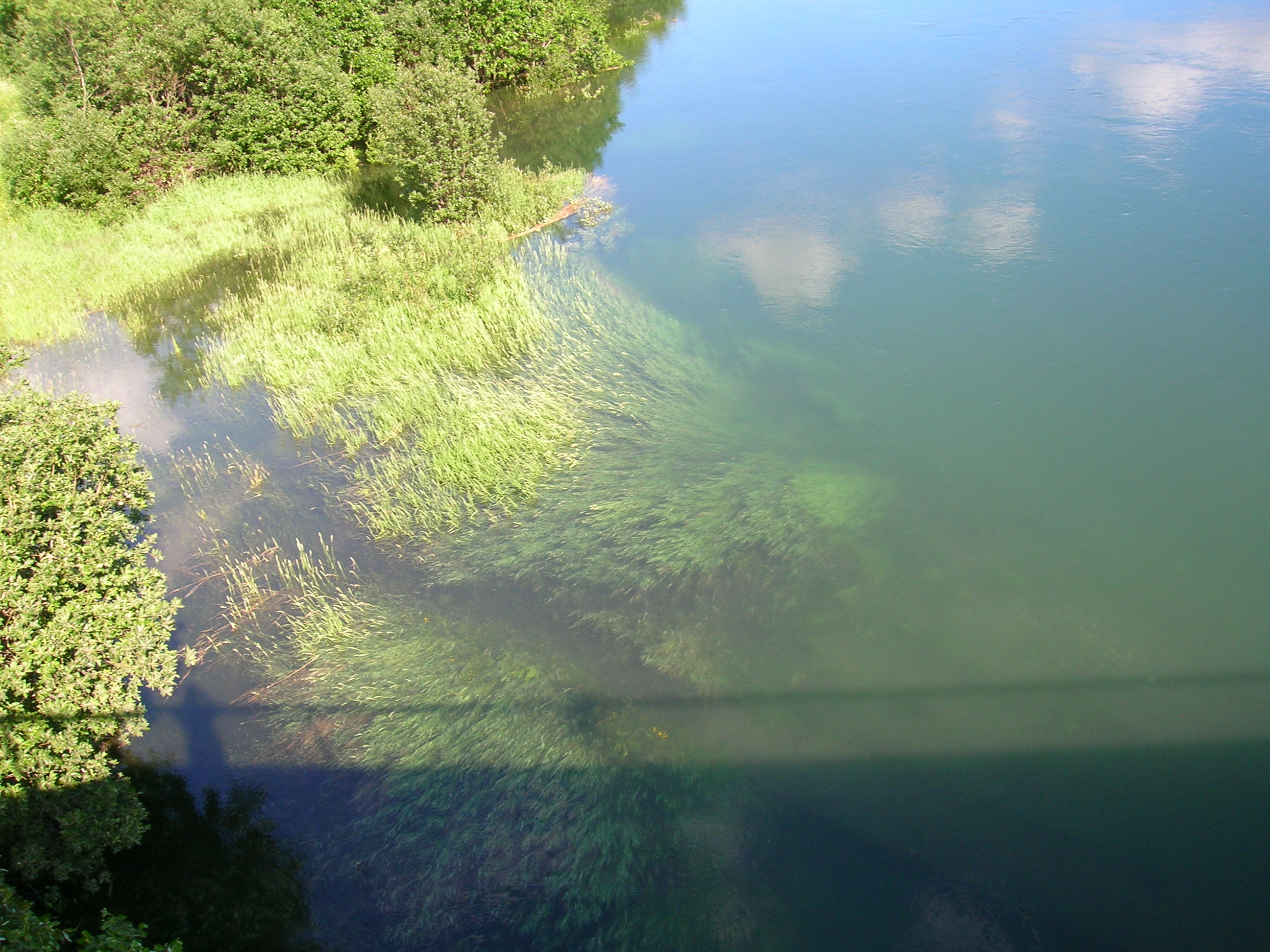
Ranelva seen from Selfors bridge

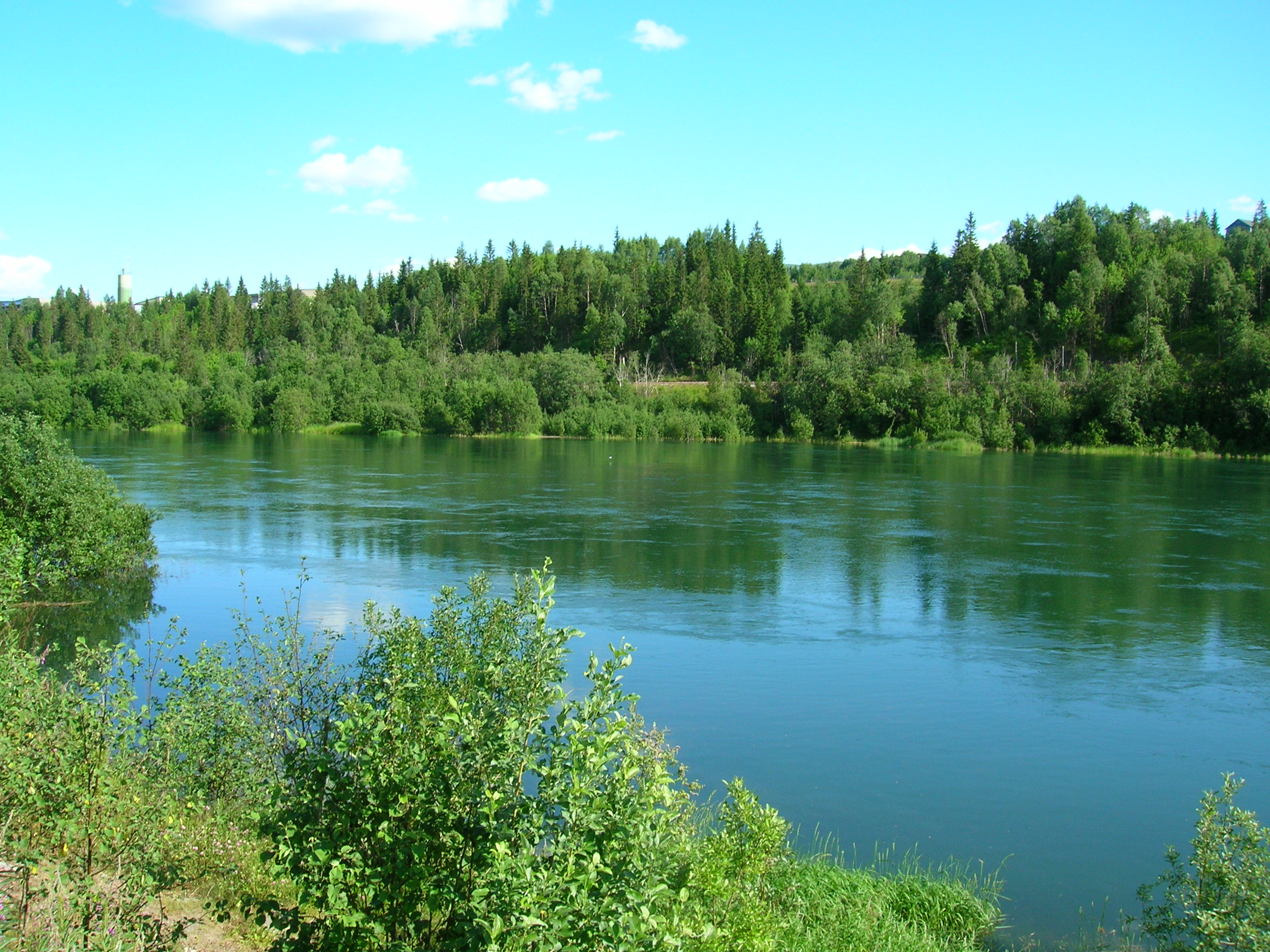

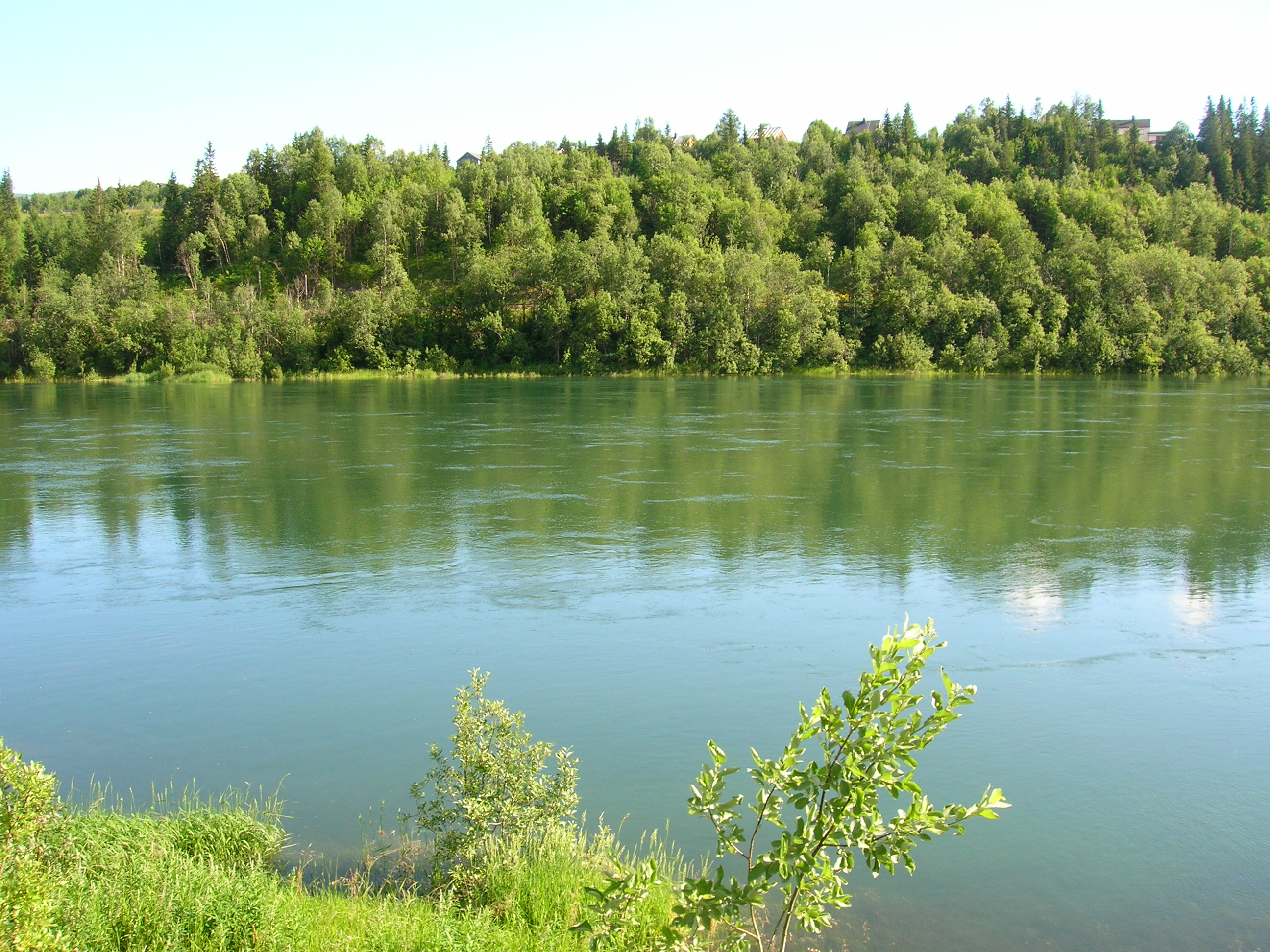

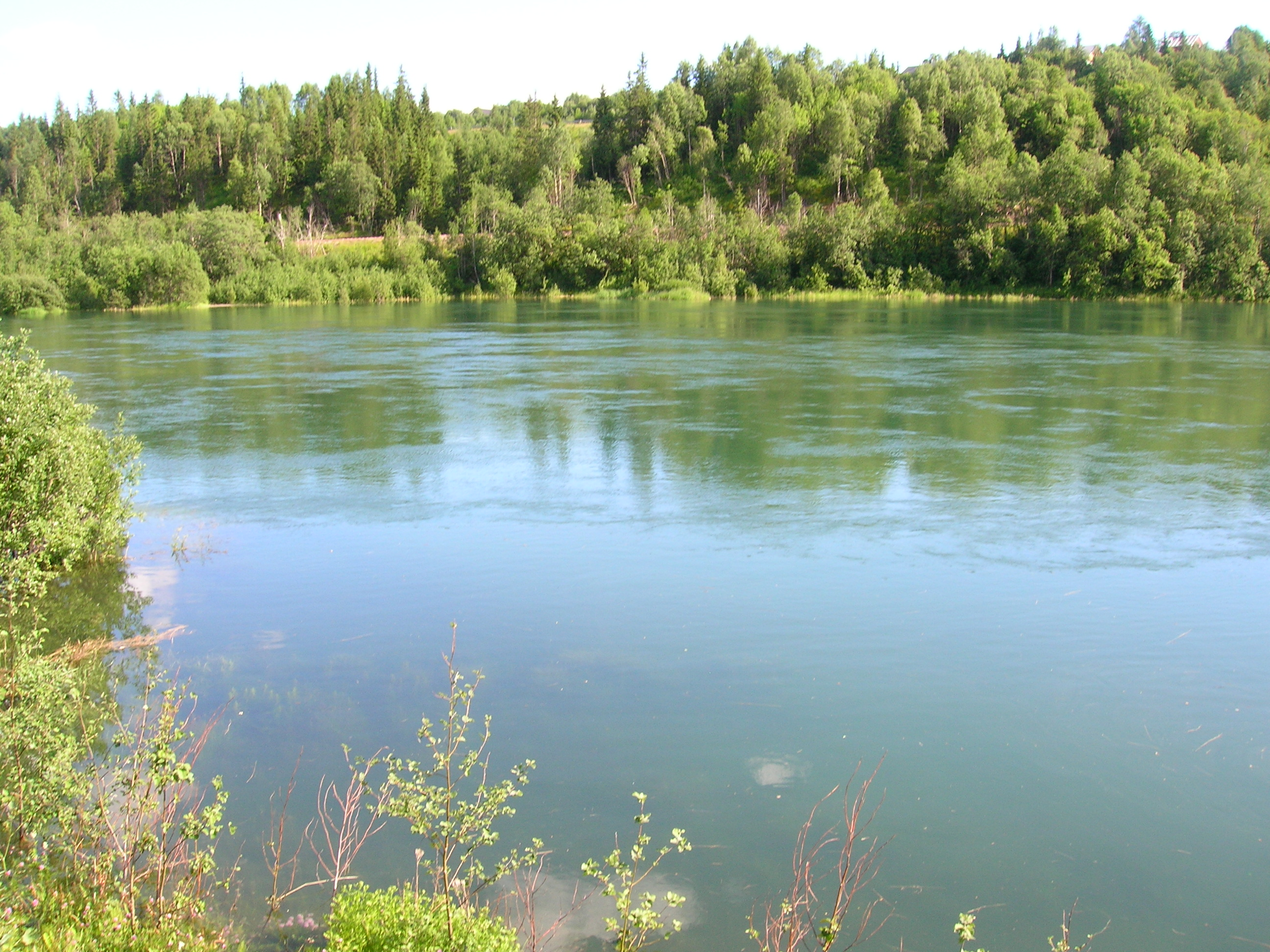

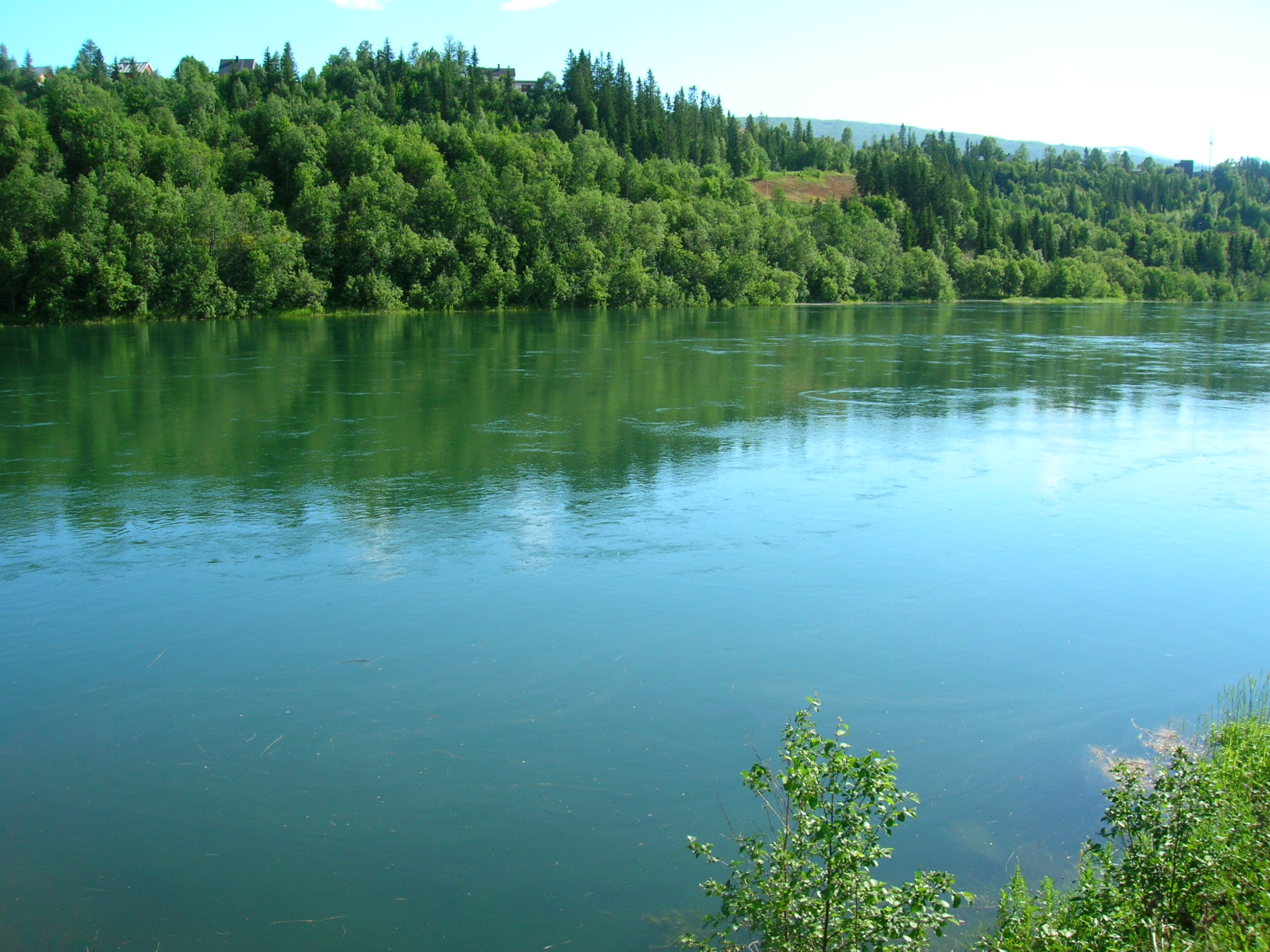

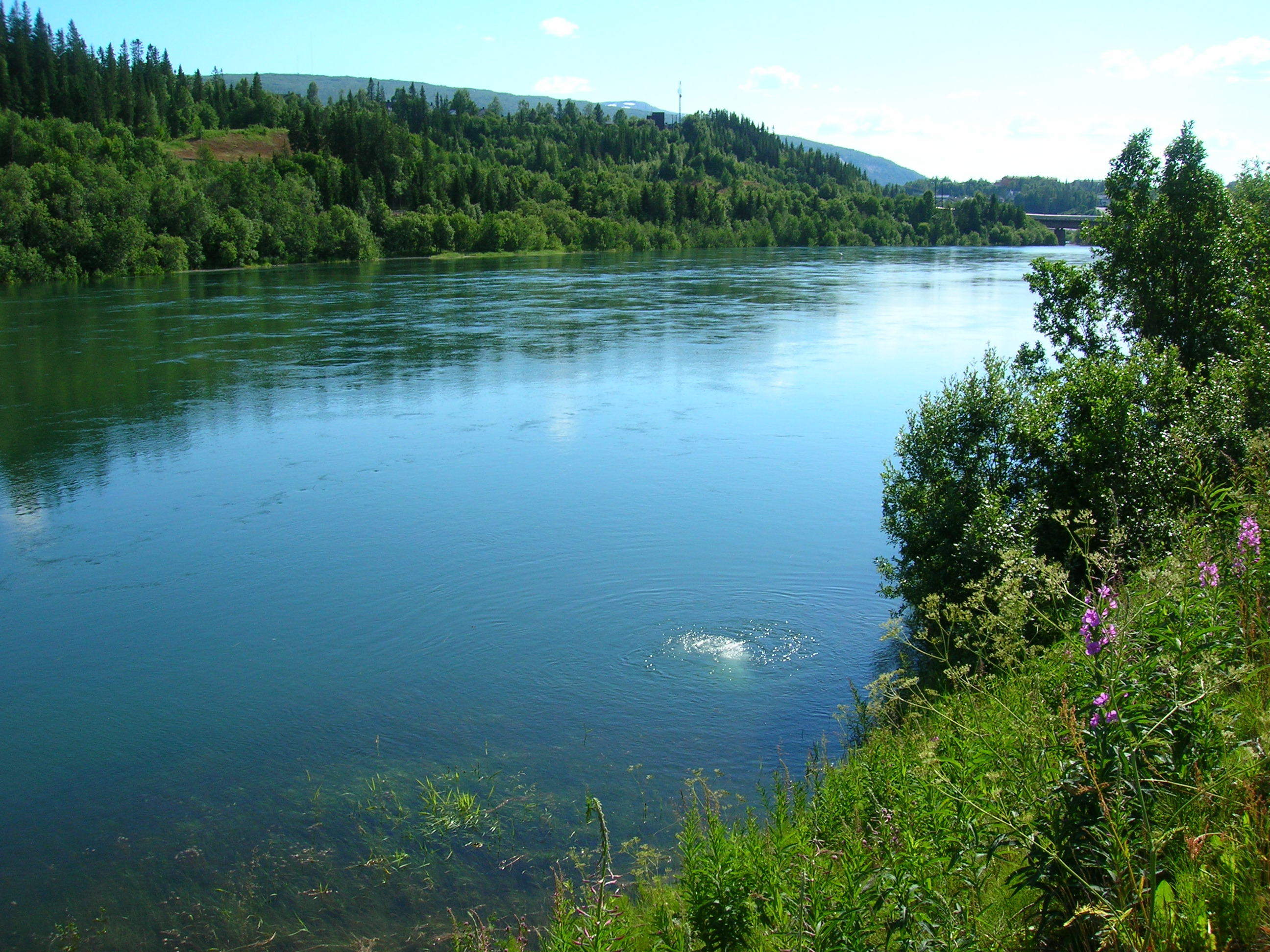

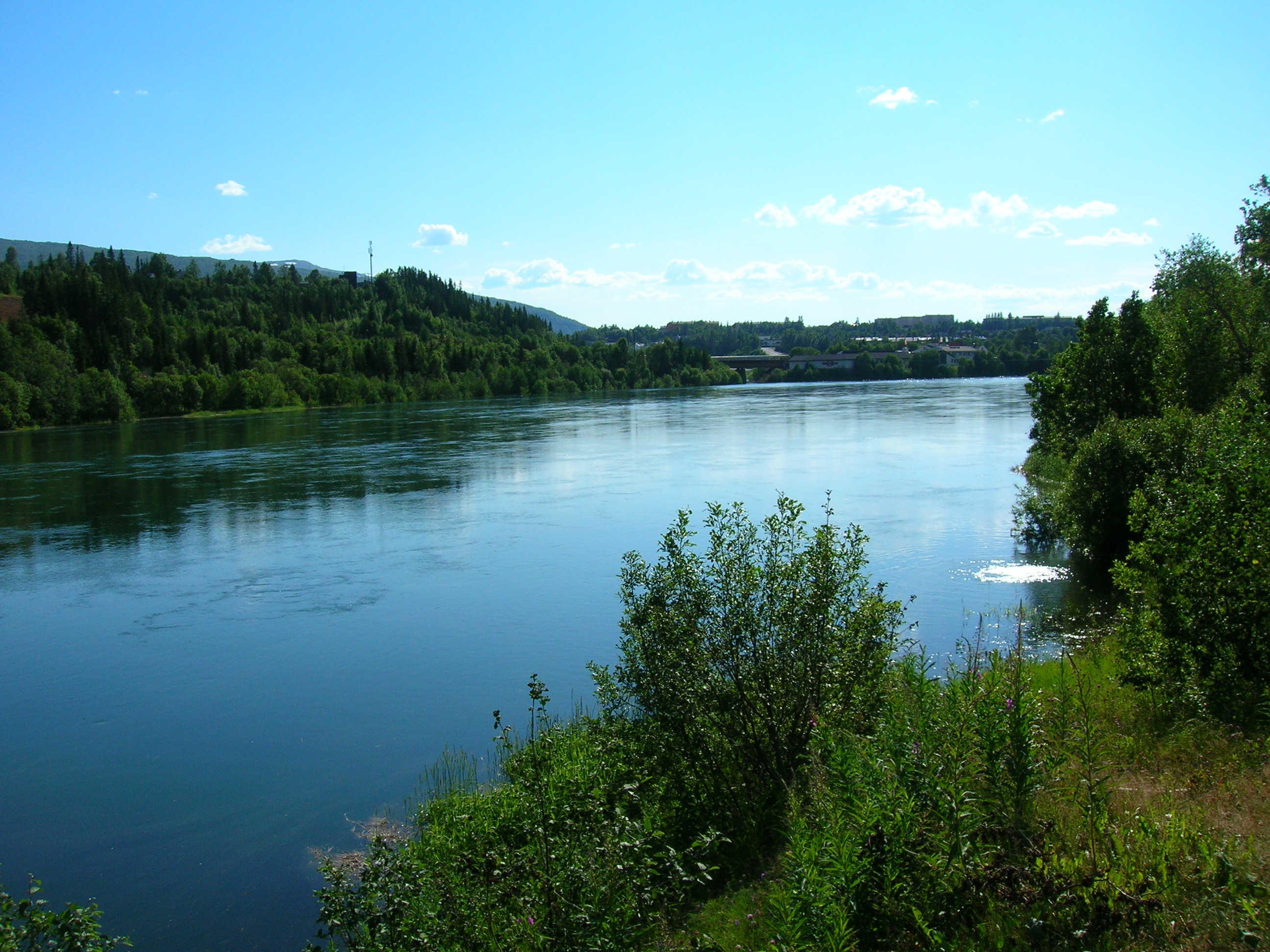

=== Fossetangen ===
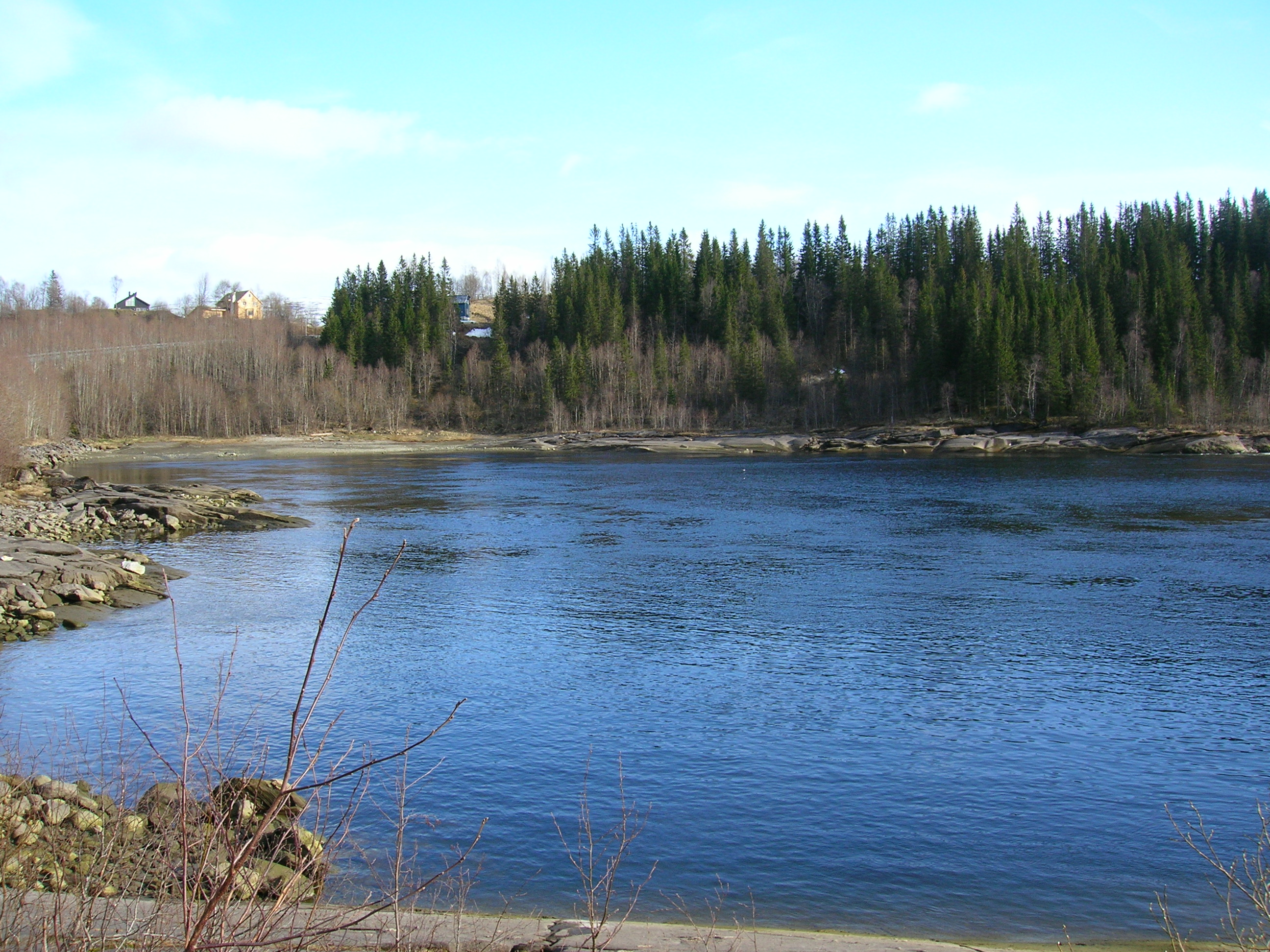

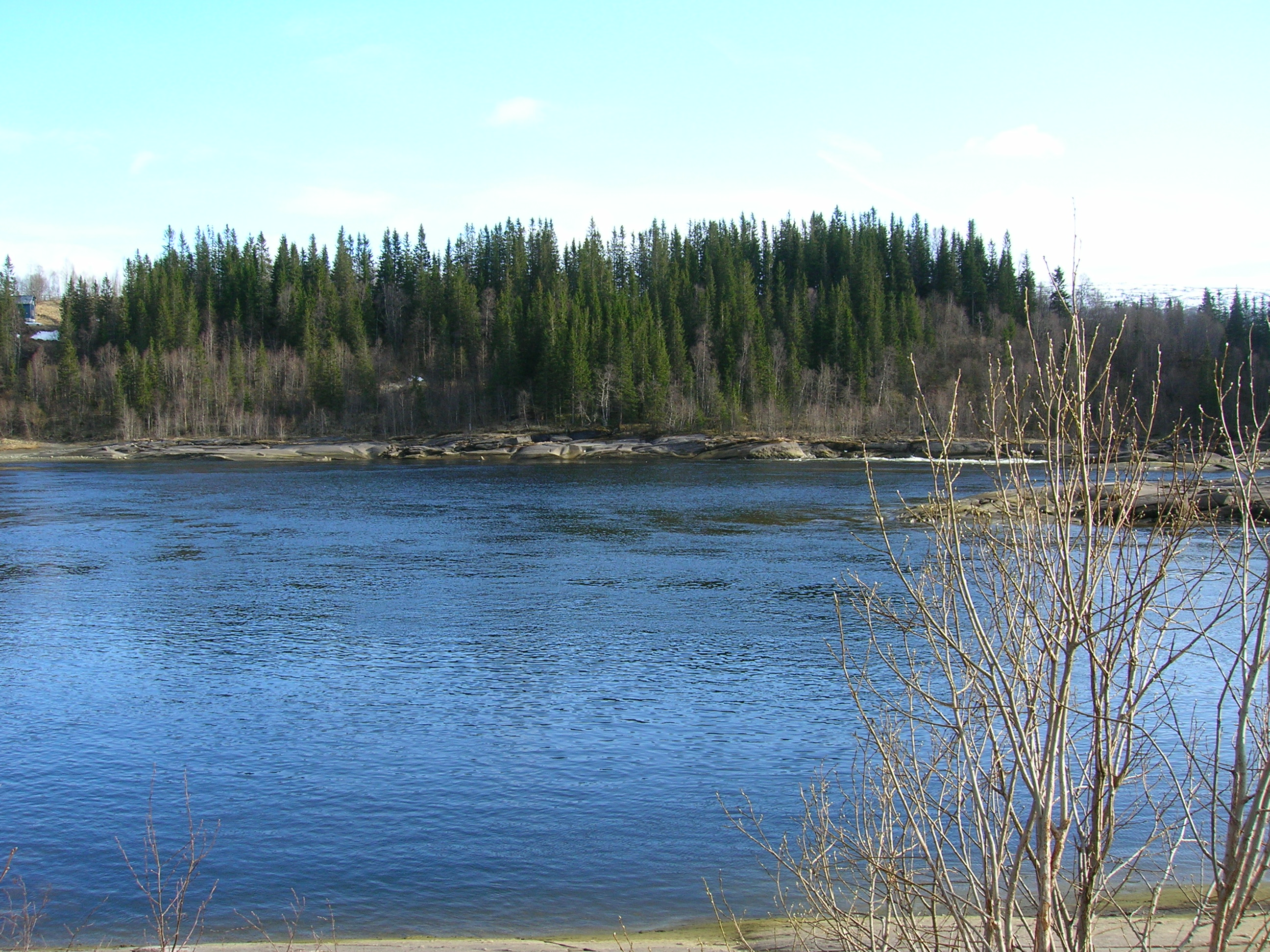

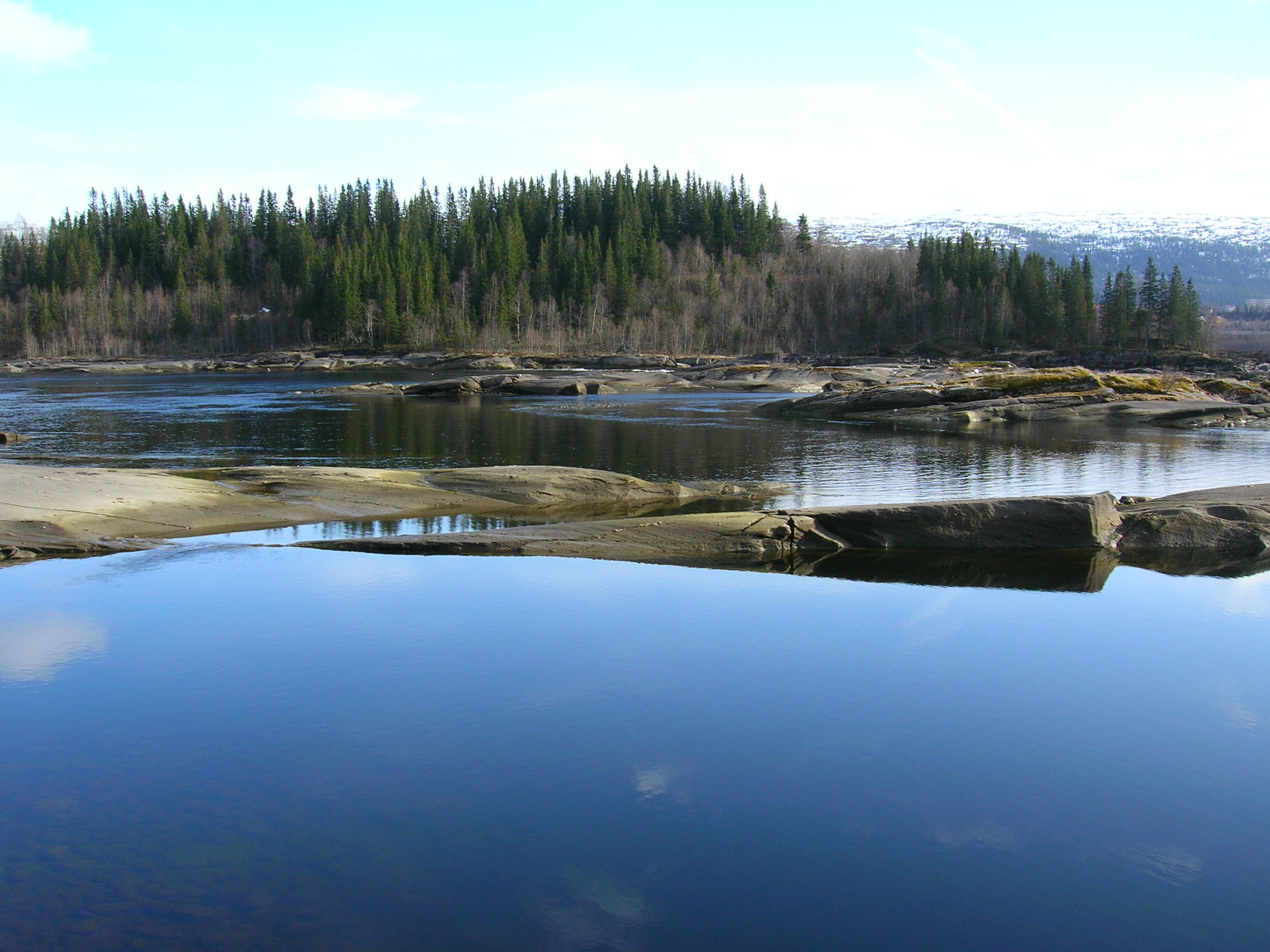

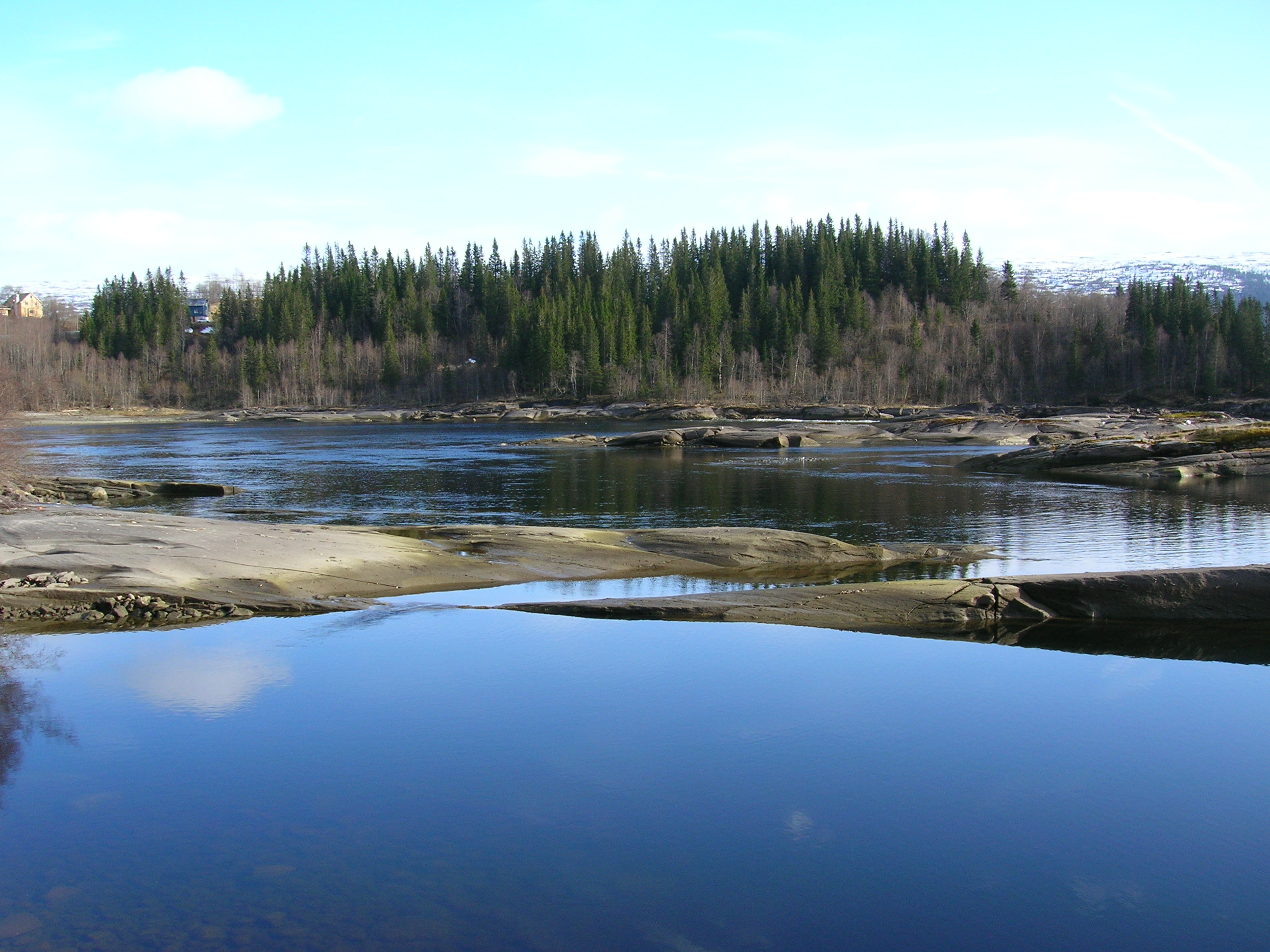

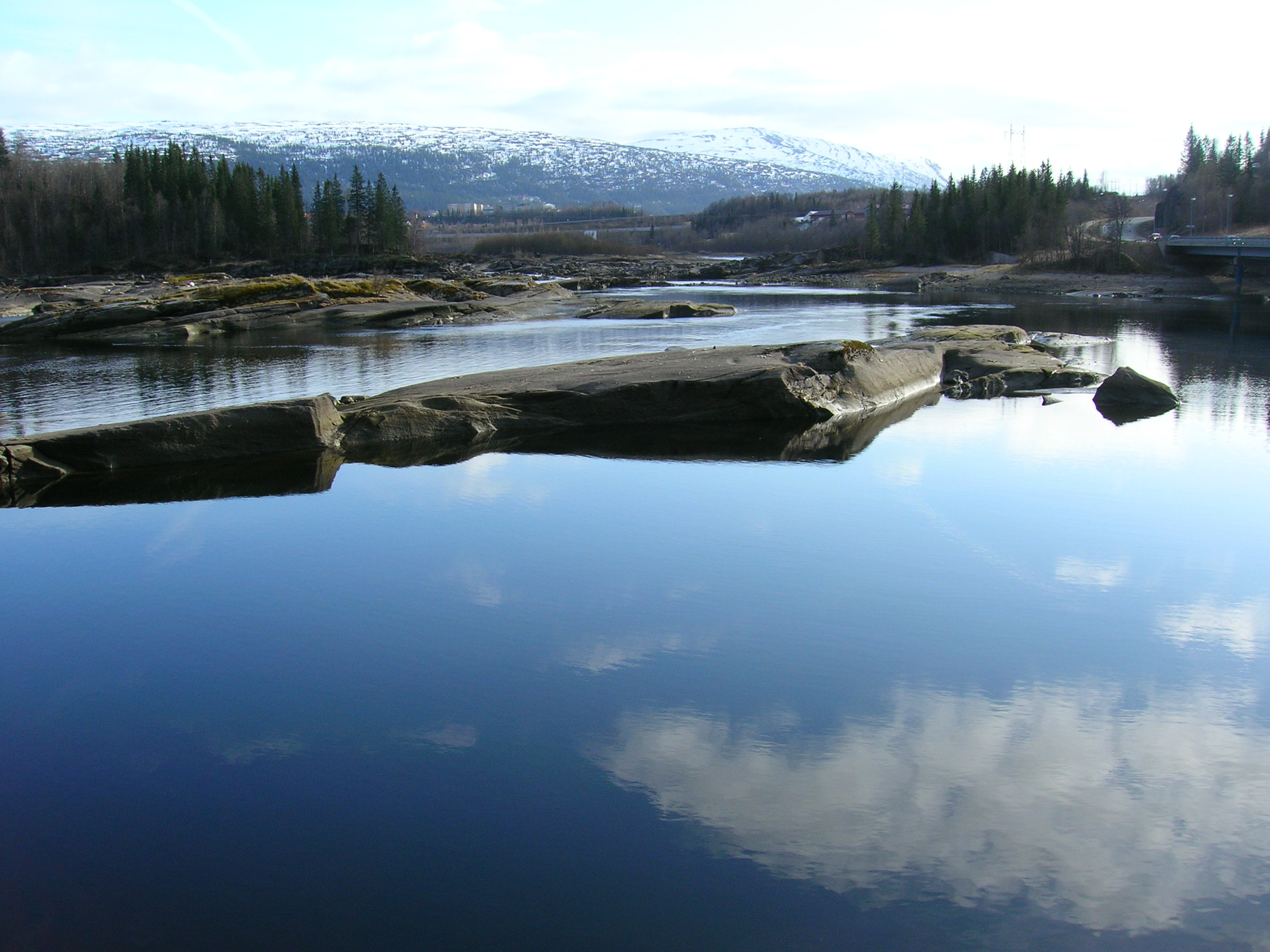

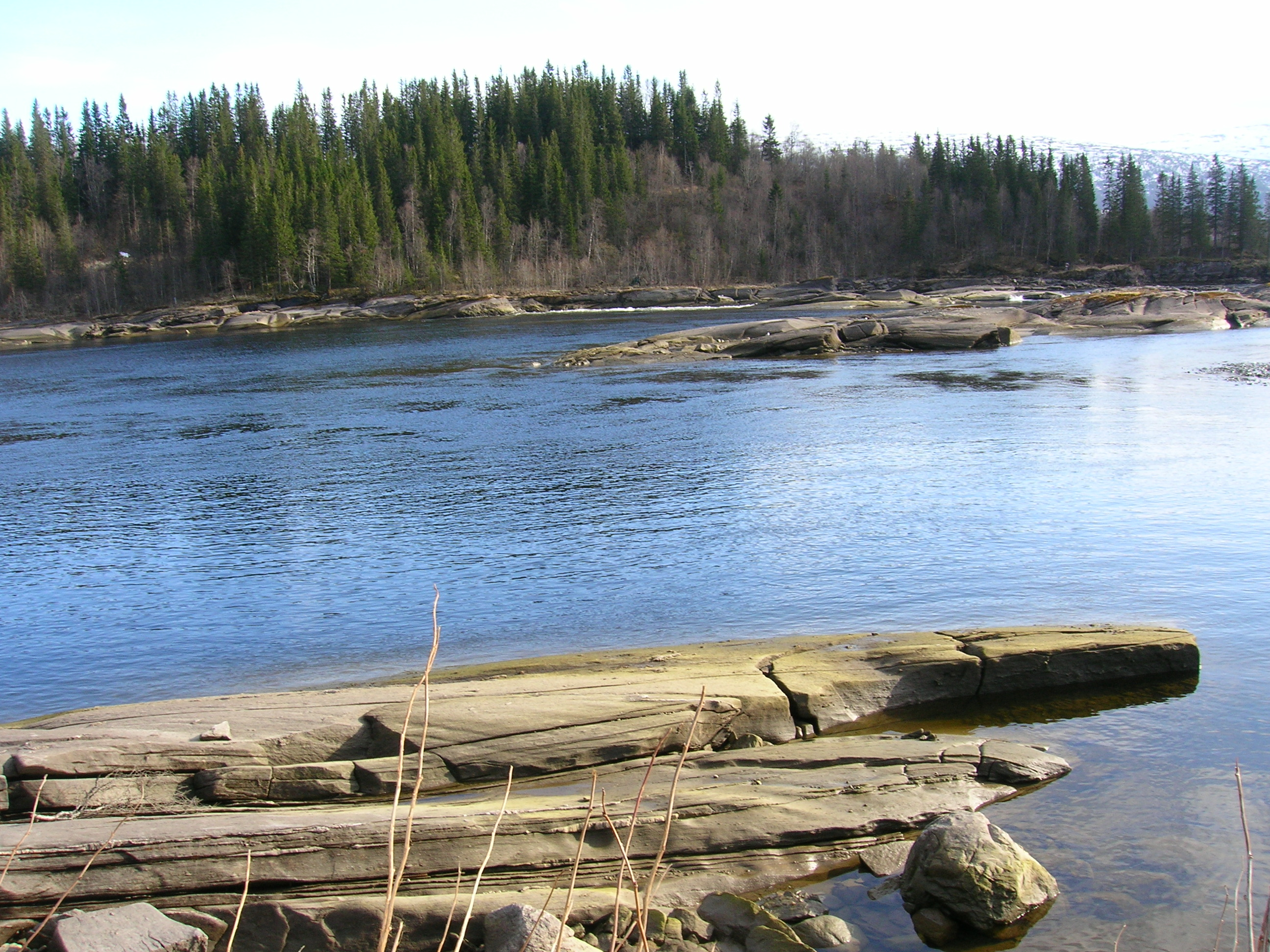

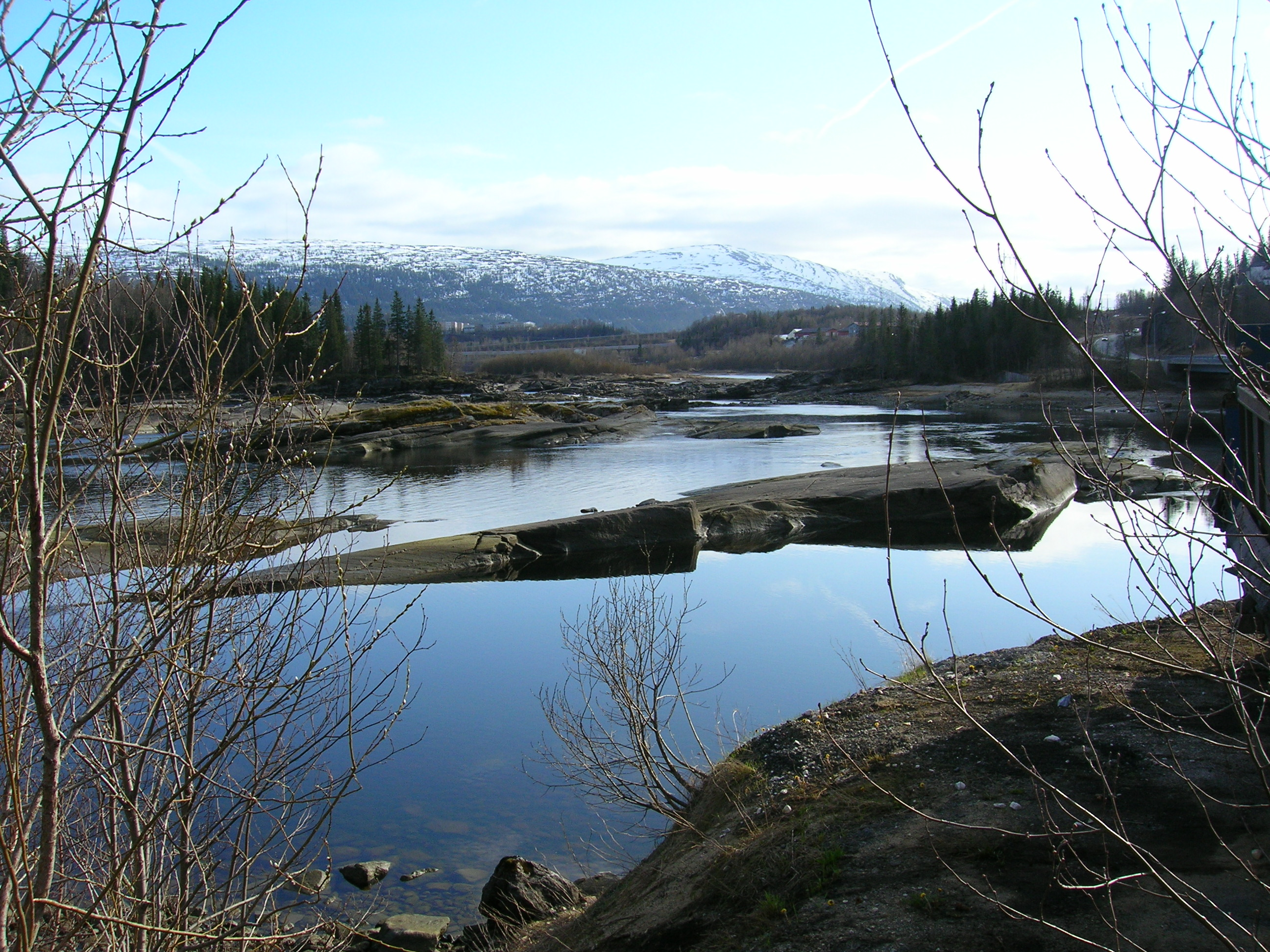

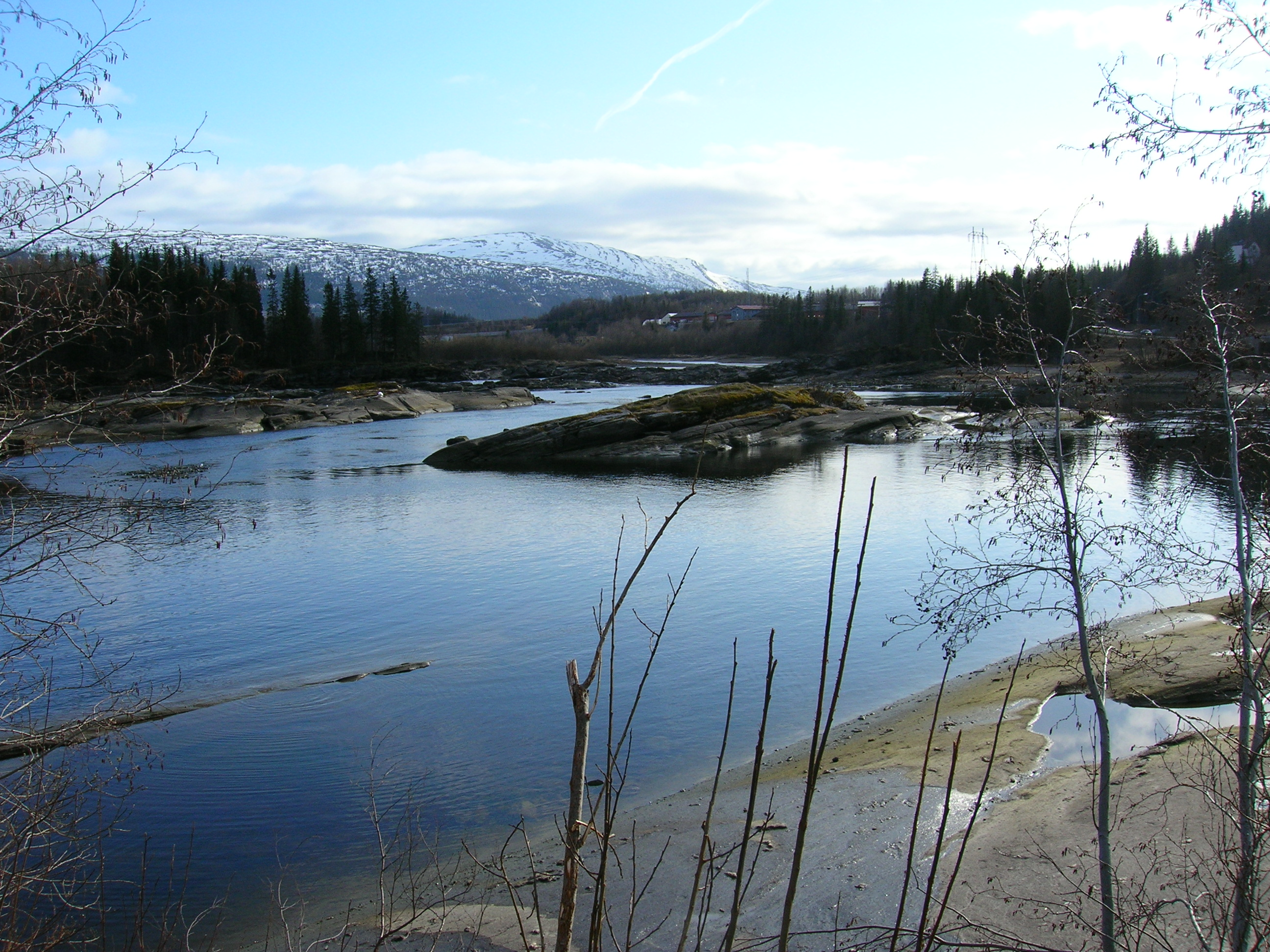

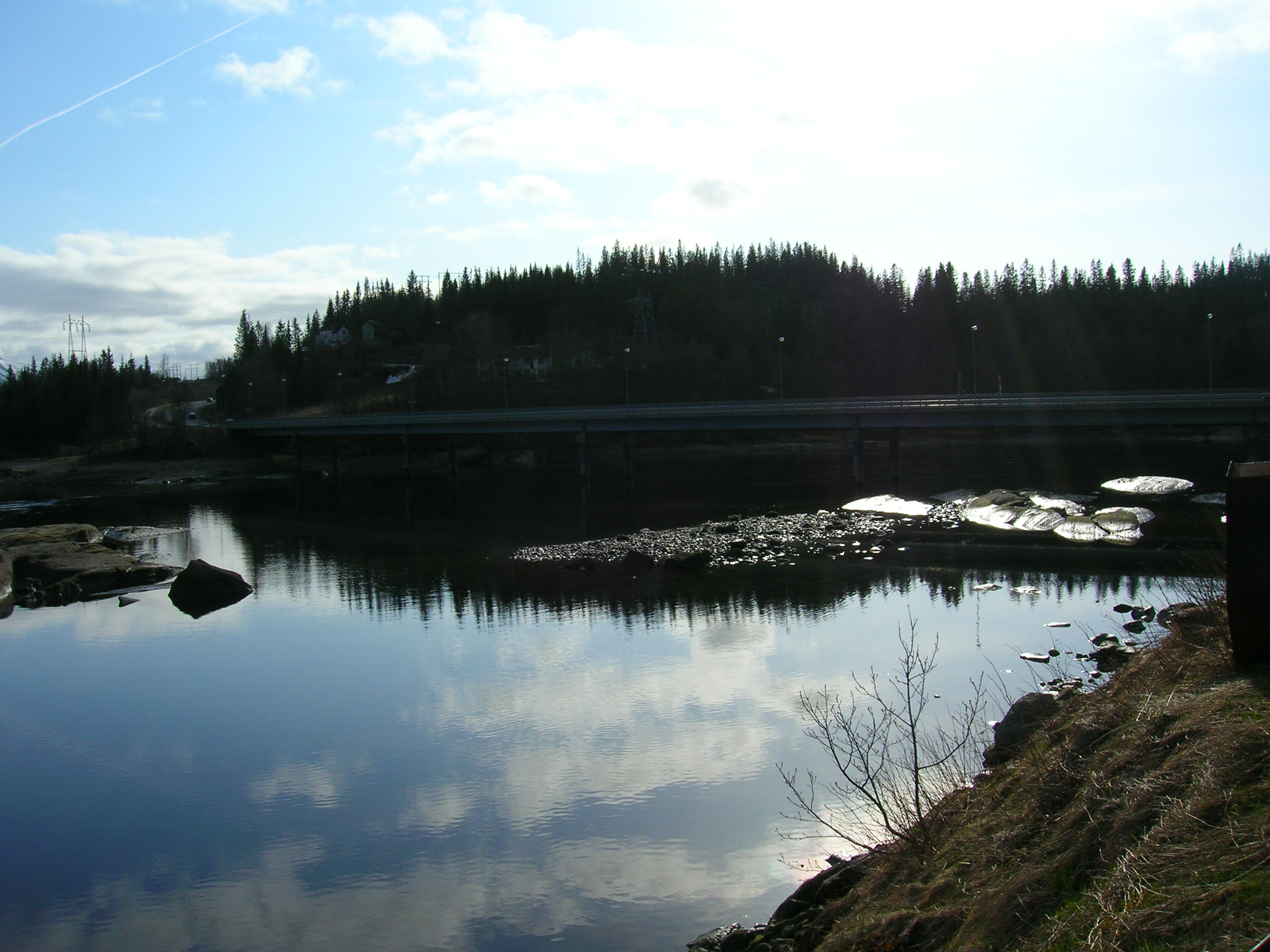

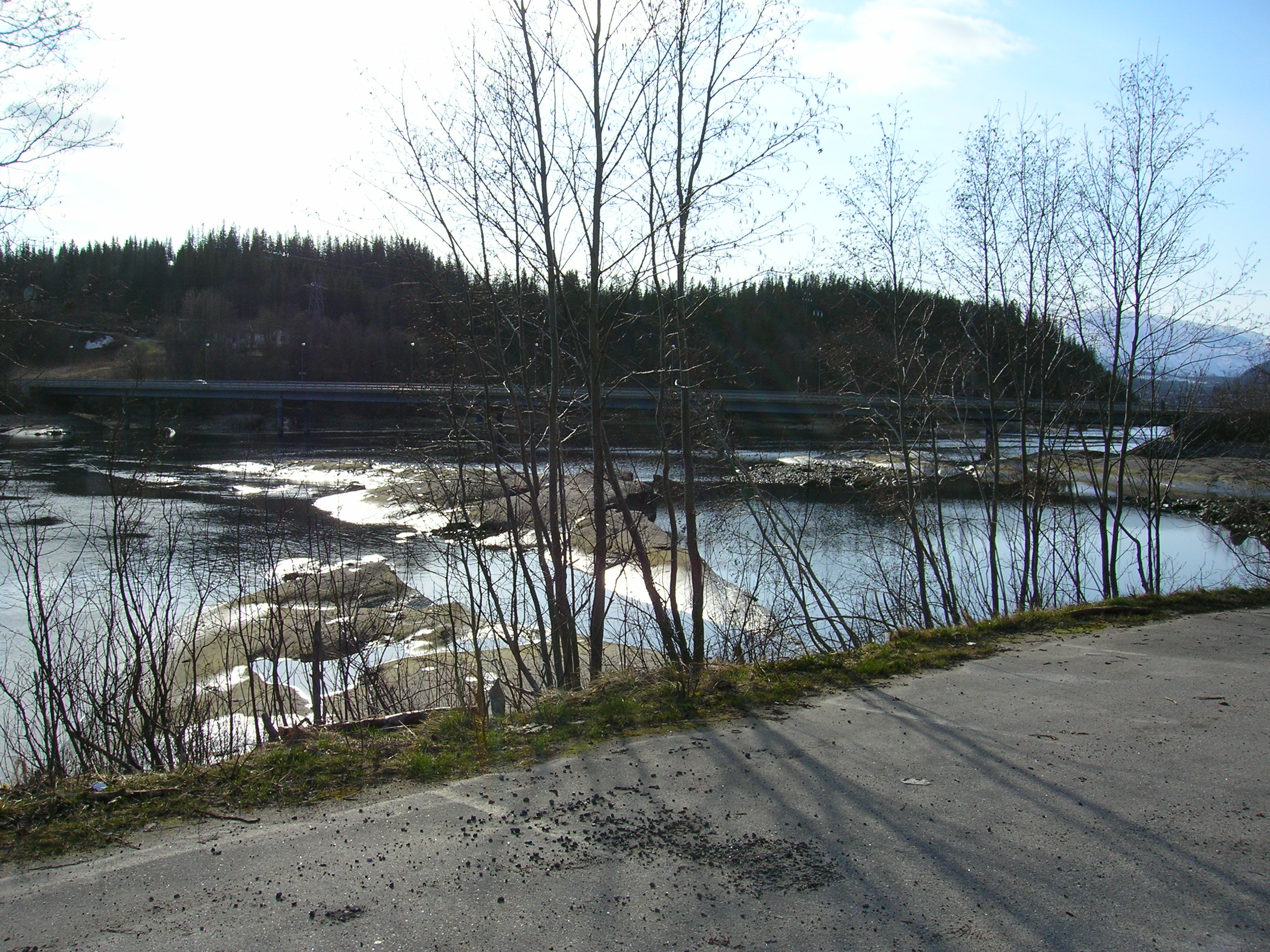

== See also ==
- List of rivers in Norway
