= Flatisvatnet =

Lake in Rana, Norway

- Bjørnefossvatnet
- Interactive map of the lake
- Location: Rana Municipality, Nordland
- Coordinates: 66.5949°N 13.9637°E
- Basin countries: Norway
- Max. length: 3.4 kilometres (2.1 mi)
- Max. width: 1.8 kilometres (1.1 mi)
- Surface area: 2.39 km^{2} (0.92 sq mi)
- Shore length^{1}: 7.41 kilometres (4.60 mi)
- Surface elevation: 293 metres (961 ft)
- References: NVE
- ^{1} Shore length is not a well-defined measure.

Flatisvatnet is a lake in the northwestern part of Rana Municipality in Nordland county, Norway. The lake is located inside the Saltfjellet–Svartisen National Park, about 30 kilometres (19 mi) north of the town of Mo i Rana. The glacial lake is also the headwaters of the Glomåga river which flows south into the lake Langvatnet. The Bjørnefoss waterfall is located on the northeastern part of the lake, and so the lake is sometimes known as the Bjørnefossvatnet (lit. 'Bjørnefoss lake').

== See also ==
- List of lakes in Norway
- Geography of Norway
