= Rana Municipality =

Municipality in Nordland, Norway

Rana Municipality Rana kommune Raanen tjïelte
- Municipality
- Ranen herred (historic name)
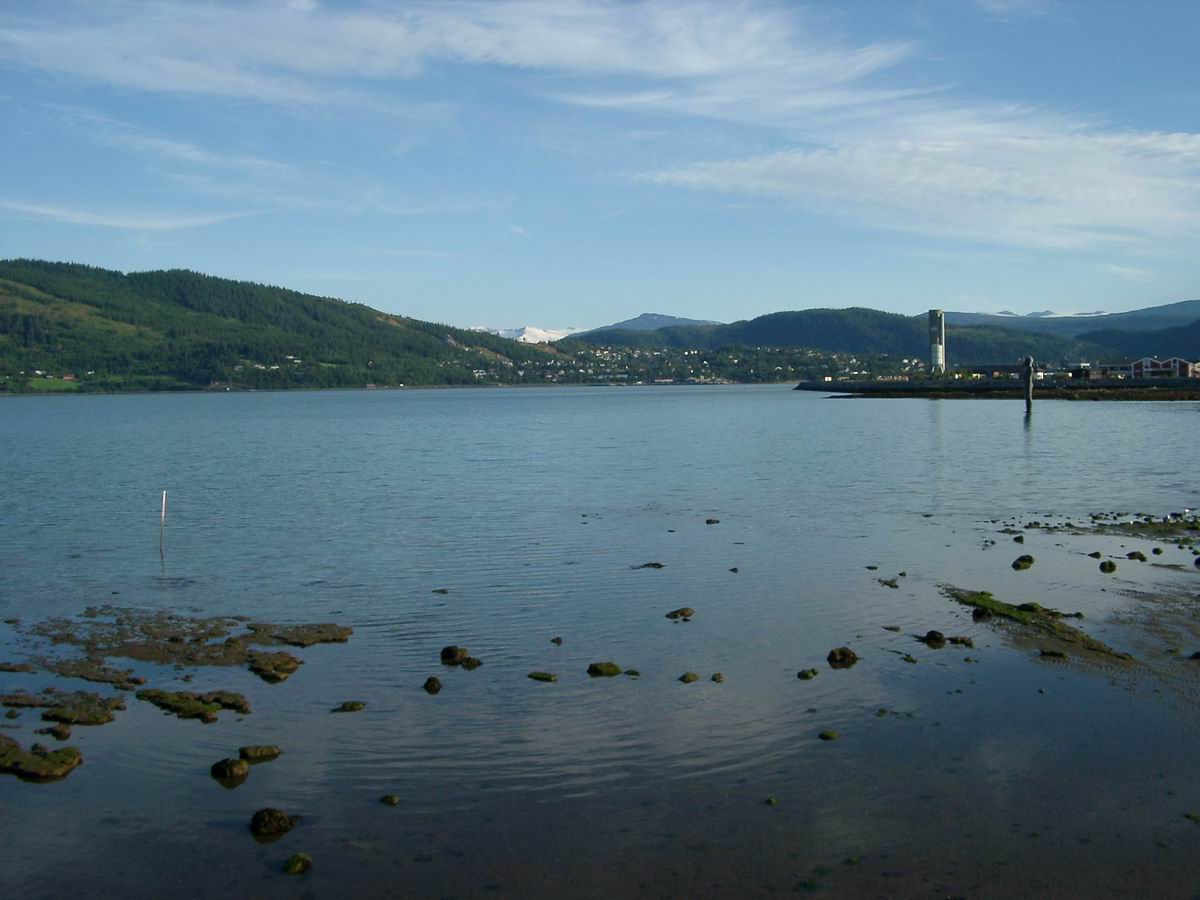
- View of Mo i Rana in late July 2003

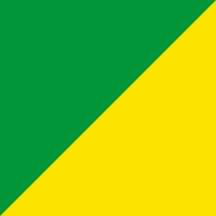
- Flag Coat of arms

- Nordland within Norway

- Rana within Nordland
- Coordinates: 66°22′19″N 14°20′34″E
- Country: Norway
- County: Nordland
- District: Helgeland
- Established: 1 Jan 1838
  - Created as: Formannskapsdistrikt
- Disestablished: 1839
  - Succeeded by: Nord-Ranen & Sør-Ranen
- Re-established: 1 Jan 1964
  - Preceded by: Mo i Rana, Nord-Rana Municipality, and other areas
- Administrative centre: Mo i Rana

Government
  - Mayor (2015): Geir Waage (Ap)

Area
  - Total: 4,460.19 km^{2} (1,722.09 sq mi)
  - Land: 4,202.66 km^{2} (1,622.66 sq mi)
  - Water: 257.53 km^{2} (99.43 sq mi) 5.8%
  - Rank: #4 in Norway
- Highest elevation: 1,589.26 m (5,214.1 ft)

Population (2024)
  - Total: 25,994
  - Rank: #47 in Norway
  - Density: 5.8/km^{2} (15/sq mi)
  - Change (10 years): ▲ +0.2%
- Demonym(s): Ranværing; Ransmann

Official language
  - Norwegian form: Neutral
- Time zone: UTC+01:00 (CET)
  - Summer (DST): UTC+02:00 (CEST)
- ISO 3166 code: NO-1833
- Website: Official website

Rana (Norwegian) or Raane (Southern Sami) is a municipality in Nordland county, Norway. It is part of the Helgeland traditional region. The administrative centre of the municipality is the town of Mo i Rana, which houses the National Library of Norway. Other population centers in Rana include Båsmoen, Dunderland, Eiteråga, Flostrand, Hauknes, Myklebustad, Nevernes, Røssvoll, Selfors, Sjonbotn, Skonseng, Storforsheia, Utskarpen, and Ytteren.

The 4,460-square-kilometre (1,720 sq mi) municipality is the 4th largest by area out of the 357 municipalities in Norway (the largest municipality outside Troms and Finnmark counties). Rana Municipality is the 47th most populous municipality in Norway with a population of 25,994. This makes it the second largest municipality in Nordland county—and the third largest in North Norway. The municipality's population density is 5.8 inhabitants per square kilometre (15/sq mi) and its population has increased by 0.2% over the previous 10-year period.

Rana was a part of the Terra Securities scandal in 2007 relating to some investments that were made by the municipality.

== General information ==
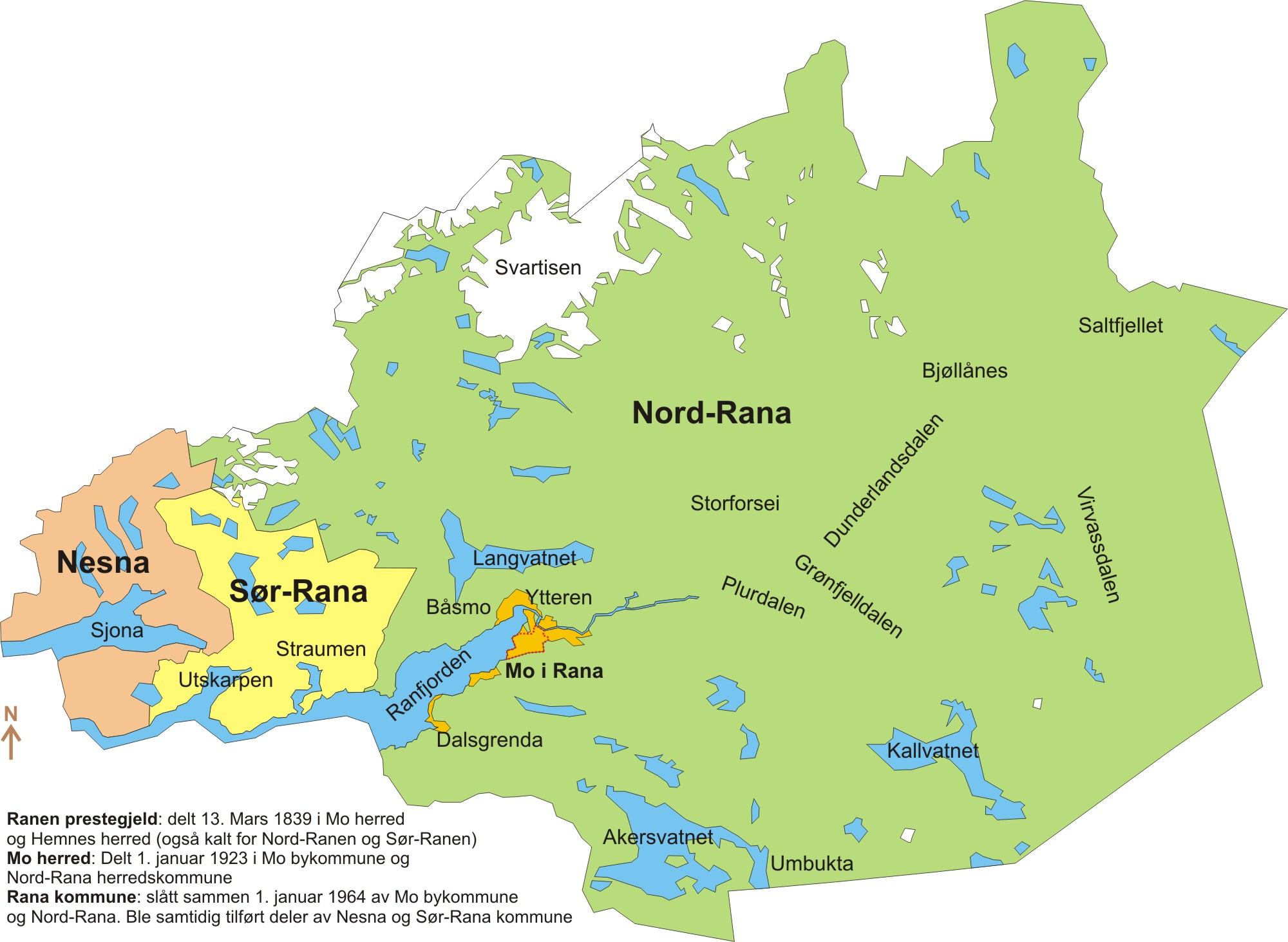
Mo i Rana and Nord-Rana Municipality plus parts of Nesna Municipality and Sør-Rana Municipality were merged in 1964 to form Rana Municipality.

=== Municipal history ===
The municipality of Rana was originally established on 1 January 1838 (see formannskapsdistrikt law). In 1839, it was divided into Nord-Ranen Municipality and Sør-Ranen Municipality. In 1844, Nord-Ranen Municipality was renamed Mo Municipality and Sør-Ranen Municipality was renamed Hemnes Municipality. On 1 January 1923, the village of Mo was separated from Mo Municipality and became a town-municipality of its own. At that time (to avoid confusion) Mo Municipality changed its name (back) to Nord-Rana Municipality and the new town was known as Mo i Rana. During the 1960s, there were many municipal mergers across Norway due to the work of the Schei Committee. On 1 January 1964, the town of Mo (population: 9,616), Nord-Rana Municipality (population: 11,636), the northern part of Sør-Rana Municipality (population: 697), and the Sjona area of Nesna Municipality (population: 543) were all merged to form Rana Municipality.

=== Name ===
The municipality is named after the river Ranelva (Old Norse: Raðund). The name of the river is probably derived from the word raðr which means "quick", "fast", or "rapid". Another possibility is that the name comes from the old Sami god Rana Niejta.

On 16 February 2024, the national government approved a resolution to add a co-equal, official Sami language name for the municipality: Raane. The spelling of the Sami language name changes depending on how it is used. It is called Raane when it is spelled alone, but it is Raanen tjïelte when using the Sami language equivalent to "Rana Municipality".

=== Coat of arms ===
The coat of arms was granted on 5 March 1965. The official blazon is "Per bend sinister vert and Or" (Norwegian: Venstre skrådelt av grønt og gull). This means the arms have a field (background) that is divided by a diagonal line from the lower left to the upper right. The field that is below the line has a tincture of Or which means it is commonly colored yellow, but if it is made out of metal, then gold is used. The field that is above the line has a tincture of green. The arms symbolize the forests (upper part/green) and the minerals (lower part/gold), as there many minerals can be found in the area, especially iron ore. The arms were originally granted to the municipality of Mo on 29 April 1960 until that municipality was dissolved on 1 January 1964 when it became part of the new municipality of Rana. The arms were designed by Gunnar Alm.

=== Churches ===
The Church of Norway has six parishes (sokn) within Rana Municipality. It is part of the Indre Helgeland prosti (deanery) in the Diocese of Sør-Hålogaland.

Churches in Rana Municipality
| Parish (sokn) | Church | Location | Year built |
|---|---|---|---|
| Gruben | Gruben Church | Mo i Rana | 1965 |
| Mo | Mo Church | Mo i Rana | 1724 |
| Nevernes | Nevernes Church | Nevernes | 1893 |
| Nord-Rana | Selfors Church | Selfors | 1973 |
| Nord-Rana | Ytteren Church | Ytteren | 1977 |
| Røssvoll | Røssvoll Church | Røssvoll | 1953 |
| Sjona | Sjona Church | Myklebustad | 1916 |

== Geography ==
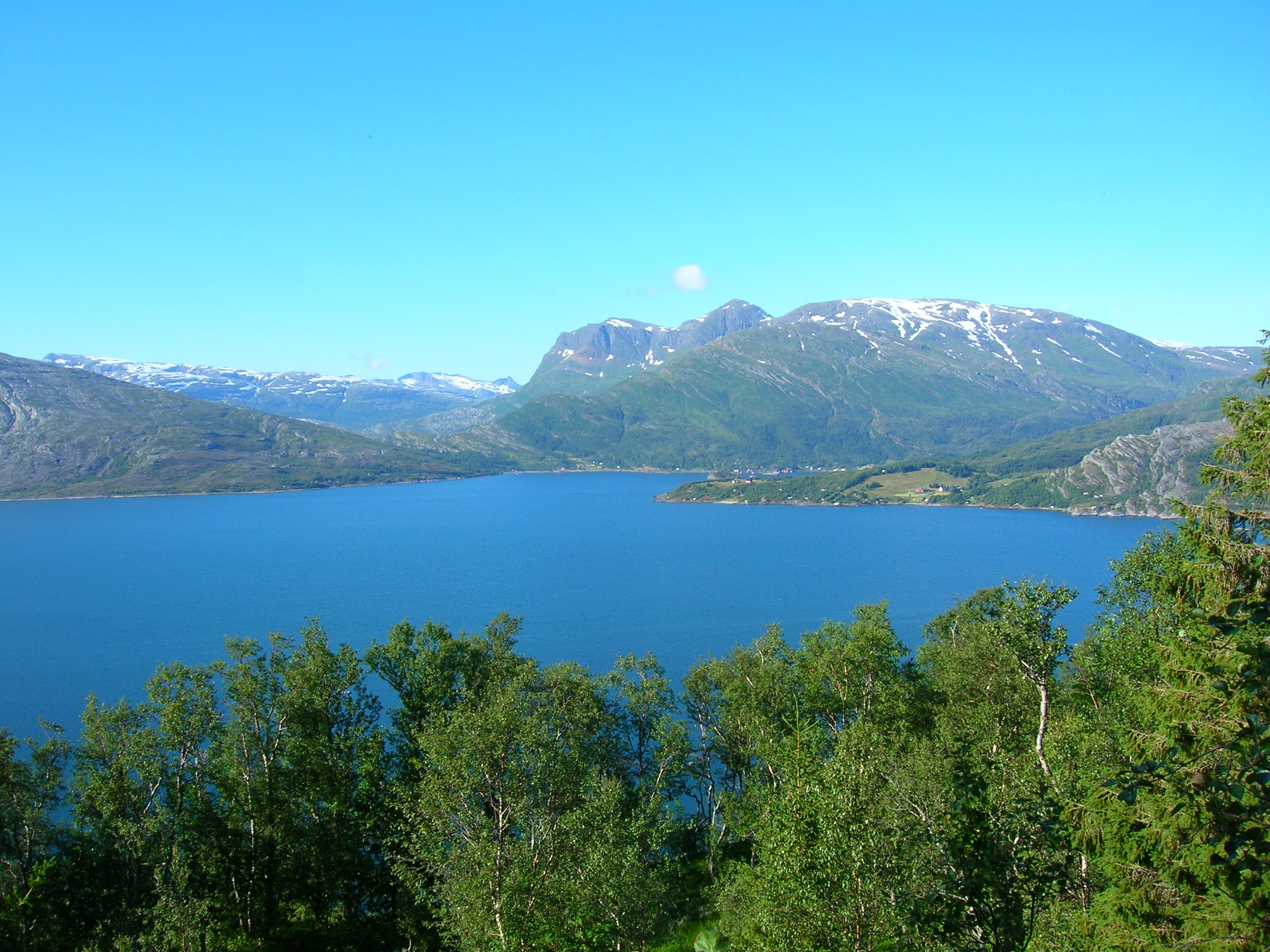
The Sjona fjord, western part of Rana municipality

The municipality is located just south of the Arctic Circle, on the southern side of the Saltfjellet mountains with the Svartisen glacier, Norway's second largest glacier. The highest point in the municipality is the 1,589.26-metre (5,214.1 ft) tall mountain Snøtinden. Some of the other large mountains in Rana include Bolna and Nasa. Mo is so close to the Arctic Circle that parts of the sun is continuously over the horizon (Midnight sun) from early June to early July, and there is no darkness from mid-May to the beginning of August. But there is no true polar night in December. The Saltfjellet–Svartisen National Park is partly located in Rana. There are many valleys such as the Dunderland Valley and Grønnfjelldal.

The majority of the population in the municipality lives in Mo i Rana, where the Ranelva (river) meets the Ranfjorden. North of Mo i Rana, the European route E6 highway passes through the suburb of Selfors. In western Rana, the population centers around the Sjona fjord.

Rana and Saltfjellet are famous for their numerous caves due to the limestone rock. Some of the caves include Grønnligrotta, Setergrotta, and Pluragrotta. There are several nature reserves in the municipality, such as Alterhaug with several warmer-climate plants grow including the elm. Engasjyen, the estuary of the Rana river, has a rich bird life in the spring. Blakkådalen has old growth spruce forests. Fisktjørna, has a largely undisturbed mixed old growth forest with unusually rich plant life due to the extremely lime-rich soil.

=== Climate ===
Nerdal/Rana (1961-90)

Climate chart (precipitation, max. and min. temperature)
| J | F | M | A | M | J | J | A | S | O | N | D |
| 146 −3 −8 | 117 −2 −7 | 112 2 −4 | 74 5 −1 | 64 12 4 | 70 16 8 | 97 18 10 | 110 16 9 | 155 11 6 | 186 6 2 | 136 1 −4 | 163 −1 −6 |
- █ Average max. and min. temperatures in °C
- █ Precipitation totals in mm
- Source: met.no/klimastatistikk/eklima
Imperial conversion
| J | F | M | A | M | J | J | A | S | O | N | D |
| 5.7 27 17 | 4.6 29 19 | 4.4 35 24 | 2.9 42 30 | 2.5 53 38 | 2.8 61 46 | 3.8 64 51 | 4.3 62 49 | 6.1 52 42 | 7.3 43 35 | 5.4 34 26 | 6.4 30 20 |
- █ Average max. and min. temperatures in °F
- █ Precipitation totals in inches

Rana is situated near the innermost part of the long Ranafjord, and the winters can be cold, especially away from the fjord. There is often a lot of snow in winter. Summer days in Rana are among the warmest in North Norway.

=== Lakes and rivers ===
There are many lakes and rivers in the municipality, both in the lowlands and in the mountains.

| Lakes | Rivers |
|---|---|
| Andfiskvatnet; Blerekvatnet; Bogvatnet; Flatisvatnet; Helgåvatnet; Holmvatnet; Kallvatnet; Langvatnet; Litlumvatnet; Nedre Fagervollvatnet; Överuman; Raudvatnet; Reingardslivatnet; Storakersvatnet; Tverrvatnet; Virvatnet | Bjøllåga; Grønfjellåga; Gubbeltåga; Langvassåga; Messingåga; Plura; Ranelva; Revelelva; Tverråga; Virvasselva |

== Government ==
Rana Municipality is responsible for primary education (through 10th grade), outpatient health services, senior citizen services, welfare and other social services, zoning, economic development, and municipal roads and utilities. The municipality is governed by a municipal council of directly elected representatives. The mayor is indirectly elected by a vote of the municipal council. The municipality is under the jurisdiction of the Helgeland District Court and the Hålogaland Court of Appeal.

=== Municipal council ===
The municipal council (Kommunestyre) of Rana Municipality is made up of 37 representatives that are elected to four year terms. The tables below show the current and historical composition of the council by political party.

Rana kommunestyre 2023–2027
| Party name (in Norwegian) | Number of representatives |
|---|---|
| Labour Party (Arbeiderpartiet) | 12 |
| Progress Party (Fremskrittspartiet) | 3 |
| Conservative Party (Høyre) | 7 |
| Industry and Business Party (Industri‑ og Næringspartiet) | 4 |
| Red Party (Rødt) | 3 |
| Centre Party (Senterpartiet) | 5 |
| Socialist Left Party (Sosialistisk Venstreparti) | 2 |
| Liberal Party (Venstre) | 1 |
| Total number of members: | 37 |

Rana kommunestyre 2019–2023
| Party name (in Norwegian) | Number of representatives |
|---|---|
| Labour Party (Arbeiderpartiet) | 11 |
| Progress Party (Fremskrittspartiet) | 3 |
| Green Party (Miljøpartiet De Grønne) | 1 |
| Conservative Party (Høyre) | 5 |
| Red Party (Rødt) | 3 |
| Centre Party (Senterpartiet) | 11 |
| Socialist Left Party (Sosialistisk Venstreparti) | 2 |
| Liberal Party (Venstre) | 1 |
| Total number of members: | 37 |

Rana kommunestyre 2015–2019
| Party name (in Norwegian) | Number of representatives |
|---|---|
| Labour Party (Arbeiderpartiet) | 17 |
| Progress Party (Fremskrittspartiet) | 3 |
| Conservative Party (Høyre) | 7 |
| Christian Democratic Party (Kristelig Folkeparti) | 1 |
| Red Party (Rødt) | 1 |
| Centre Party (Senterpartiet) | 4 |
| Socialist Left Party (Sosialistisk Venstreparti) | 3 |
| Liberal Party (Venstre) | 1 |
| Total number of members: | 37 |

Rana kommunestyre 2011–2015
| Party name (in Norwegian) | Number of representatives |
|---|---|
| Labour Party (Arbeiderpartiet) | 13 |
| Progress Party (Fremskrittspartiet) | 4 |
| Conservative Party (Høyre) | 10 |
| Christian Democratic Party (Kristelig Folkeparti) | 1 |
| Red Party (Rødt) | 1 |
| Centre Party (Senterpartiet) | 3 |
| Socialist Left Party (Sosialistisk Venstreparti) | 2 |
| Liberal Party (Venstre) | 1 |
| Environment List Rana (Miljølisten Rana) | 2 |
| Total number of members: | 37 |

Rana kommunestyre 2007–2011
| Party name (in Norwegian) | Number of representatives |
|---|---|
| Labour Party (Arbeiderpartiet) | 11 |
| Progress Party (Fremskrittspartiet) | 7 |
| Conservative Party (Høyre) | 3 |
| Christian Democratic Party (Kristelig Folkeparti) | 1 |
| Red Electoral Alliance (Rød Valgallianse) | 1 |
| Centre Party (Senterpartiet) | 2 |
| Socialist Left Party (Sosialistisk Venstreparti) | 7 |
| Liberal Party (Venstre) | 1 |
| Environment List Rana (Miljølisten Rana) | 4 |
| Total number of members: | 37 |

Rana kommunestyre 2003–2007
| Party name (in Norwegian) | Number of representatives |
|---|---|
| Labour Party (Arbeiderpartiet) | 12 |
| Progress Party (Fremskrittspartiet) | 4 |
| Conservative Party (Høyre) | 3 |
| Red Electoral Alliance (Rød Valgallianse) | 1 |
| Centre Party (Senterpartiet) | 2 |
| Socialist Left Party (Sosialistisk Venstreparti) | 14 |
| Liberal Party (Venstre) | 1 |
| Total number of members: | 37 |

Rana kommunestyre 1999–2003
| Party name (in Norwegian) | Number of representatives |
|---|---|
| Labour Party (Arbeiderpartiet) | 20 |
| Progress Party (Fremskrittspartiet) | 4 |
| Conservative Party (Høyre) | 5 |
| Christian Democratic Party (Kristelig Folkeparti) | 2 |
| Red Electoral Alliance (Rød Valgallianse) | 2 |
| Centre Party (Senterpartiet) | 3 |
| Socialist Left Party (Sosialistisk Venstreparti) | 9 |
| Liberal Party (Venstre) | 4 |
| Total number of members: | 49 |

Rana kommunestyre 1995–1999
| Party name (in Norwegian) | Number of representatives |
|---|---|
| Labour Party (Arbeiderpartiet) | 24 |
| Progress Party (Fremskrittspartiet) | 4 |
| Conservative Party (Høyre) | 5 |
| Christian Democratic Party (Kristelig Folkeparti) | 1 |
| Red Electoral Alliance (Rød Valgallianse) | 2 |
| Centre Party (Senterpartiet) | 6 |
| Socialist Left Party (Sosialistisk Venstreparti) | 6 |
| Liberal Party (Venstre) | 1 |
| Total number of members: | 49 |

Rana kommunestyre 1991–1995
| Party name (in Norwegian) | Number of representatives |
|---|---|
| Labour Party (Arbeiderpartiet) | 22 |
| Progress Party (Fremskrittspartiet) | 2 |
| Conservative Party (Høyre) | 5 |
| Christian Democratic Party (Kristelig Folkeparti) | 1 |
| Red Electoral Alliance (Rød Valgallianse) | 1 |
| Centre Party (Senterpartiet) | 4 |
| Socialist Left Party (Sosialistisk Venstreparti) | 13 |
| Liberal Party (Venstre) | 1 |
| Total number of members: | 49 |

Rana kommunestyre 1987–1991
| Party name (in Norwegian) | Number of representatives |
|---|---|
| Labour Party (Arbeiderpartiet) | 30 |
| Progress Party (Fremskrittspartiet) | 4 |
| Conservative Party (Høyre) | 9 |
| Christian Democratic Party (Kristelig Folkeparti) | 2 |
| Red Electoral Alliance (Rød Valgallianse) | 1 |
| Centre Party (Senterpartiet) | 1 |
| Socialist Left Party (Sosialistisk Venstreparti) | 12 |
| Liberal Party (Venstre) | 2 |
| Total number of members: | 61 |

Rana kommunestyre 1983–1987
| Party name (in Norwegian) | Number of representatives |
|---|---|
| Labour Party (Arbeiderpartiet) | 34 |
| Progress Party (Fremskrittspartiet) | 1 |
| Conservative Party (Høyre) | 9 |
| Christian Democratic Party (Kristelig Folkeparti) | 2 |
| Red Electoral Alliance (Rød Valgallianse) | 1 |
| Centre Party (Senterpartiet) | 2 |
| Socialist Left Party (Sosialistisk Venstreparti) | 10 |
| Liberal Party (Venstre) | 2 |
| Total number of members: | 61 |

Rana kommunestyre 1979–1983
| Party name (in Norwegian) | Number of representatives |
|---|---|
| Labour Party (Arbeiderpartiet) | 32 |
| Conservative Party (Høyre) | 12 |
| Christian Democratic Party (Kristelig Folkeparti) | 3 |
| Red Electoral Alliance (Rød Valgallianse) | 1 |
| Centre Party (Senterpartiet) | 3 |
| Socialist Left Party (Sosialistisk Venstreparti) | 7 |
| Liberal Party (Venstre) | 2 |
| Joint list of the Communist Party and independent socialists (Norges Kommunistiske Parti og uavhengige sosialister) | 1 |
| Total number of members: | 61 |

Rana kommunestyre 1975–1979
| Party name (in Norwegian) | Number of representatives |
|---|---|
| Labour Party (Arbeiderpartiet) | 36 |
| Conservative Party (Høyre) | 6 |
| Christian Democratic Party (Kristelig Folkeparti) | 3 |
| Centre Party (Senterpartiet) | 4 |
| Socialist Left Party (Sosialistisk Venstreparti) | 9 |
| Liberal Party (Venstre) | 2 |
| Free Voters (Frie Velgere) | 1 |
| Total number of members: | 61 |

Rana kommunestyre 1971–1975
| Party name (in Norwegian) | Number of representatives |
|---|---|
| Labour Party (Arbeiderpartiet) | 32 |
| Conservative Party (Høyre) | 5 |
| Communist Party (Kommunistiske Parti) | 3 |
| Christian Democratic Party (Kristelig Folkeparti) | 2 |
| Centre Party (Senterpartiet) | 4 |
| Socialist People's Party (Sosialistisk Folkeparti) | 8 |
| Liberal Party (Venstre) | 2 |
| Local List(s) (Lokale lister) | 5 |
| Total number of members: | 61 |

Rana kommunestyre 1967–1971
| Party name (in Norwegian) | Number of representatives |
|---|---|
| Labour Party (Arbeiderpartiet) | 34 |
| Conservative Party (Høyre) | 5 |
| Communist Party (Kommunistiske Parti) | 2 |
| Christian Democratic Party (Kristelig Folkeparti) | 2 |
| Centre Party (Senterpartiet) | 2 |
| Socialist People's Party (Sosialistisk Folkeparti) | 11 |
| Liberal Party (Venstre) | 3 |
| Local List(s) (Lokale lister) | 2 |
| Total number of members: | 61 |

Rana kommunestyre 1964–1967
| Party name (in Norwegian) | Number of representatives |
|---|---|
| Labour Party (Arbeiderpartiet) | 37 |
| Conservative Party (Høyre) | 6 |
| Communist Party (Kommunistiske Parti) | 4 |
| Christian Democratic Party (Kristelig Folkeparti) | 2 |
| Centre Party (Senterpartiet) | 3 |
| Socialist People's Party (Sosialistisk Folkeparti) | 7 |
| Liberal Party (Venstre) | 2 |
| Total number of members: | 61 |
Note: On 1 January 1964, Rana Municipality was established when Mo i Rana and Nord-Rana Municipality were merged with parts of Sør-Rana Municipality and Nesna Municipality.

=== Mayors ===
The mayor (Norwegian: ordfører) of Rana Municipality is the political leader of the municipality and the chairperson of the municipal council. Here is a list of people who have held this position:

- 1964–1965: Per Karstensen (Ap)
- 1965–1976: Alf Andreas Øverli (Ap)
- 1976–1985: Bjørg Simonsen (Ap)
- 1986–1987: Ole Ingar Lindseth (Ap)
- 1987–2003: Svein Bogen (Ap)
- 2003–2007: Inge Myrvoll (SV)
- 2007–2011: Geir Waage (Ap)
- 2011–2015: Kai Henning Henriksen (H)
- 2015–present: Geir Waage (Ap)

== Economy ==
As of 2023, FREYR has a so-called test factory for battery technology in Rana. The size of the factory is 13,000 square metres (140,000 sq ft). It had 70 employees before 10 were laid off in late November 2023. As of Q4 2023, the first production line had been delayed. The company said that it would halve its cash expenses for 2024.

== Transportation ==
Rana has an airport, Mo i Rana Airport, Røssvoll in the village of Røssvoll, not far from the town of Mo i Rana. There are several large highways in Rana: European route E6, Norwegian County Road 17, and Norwegian County Road 12. The Illhollia Tunnel is part of the E6 highway. The Nordland Line passes through Rana, with several stations including Mo i Rana Station, Dunderland Station, and Bolna Station.

== Media gallery ==
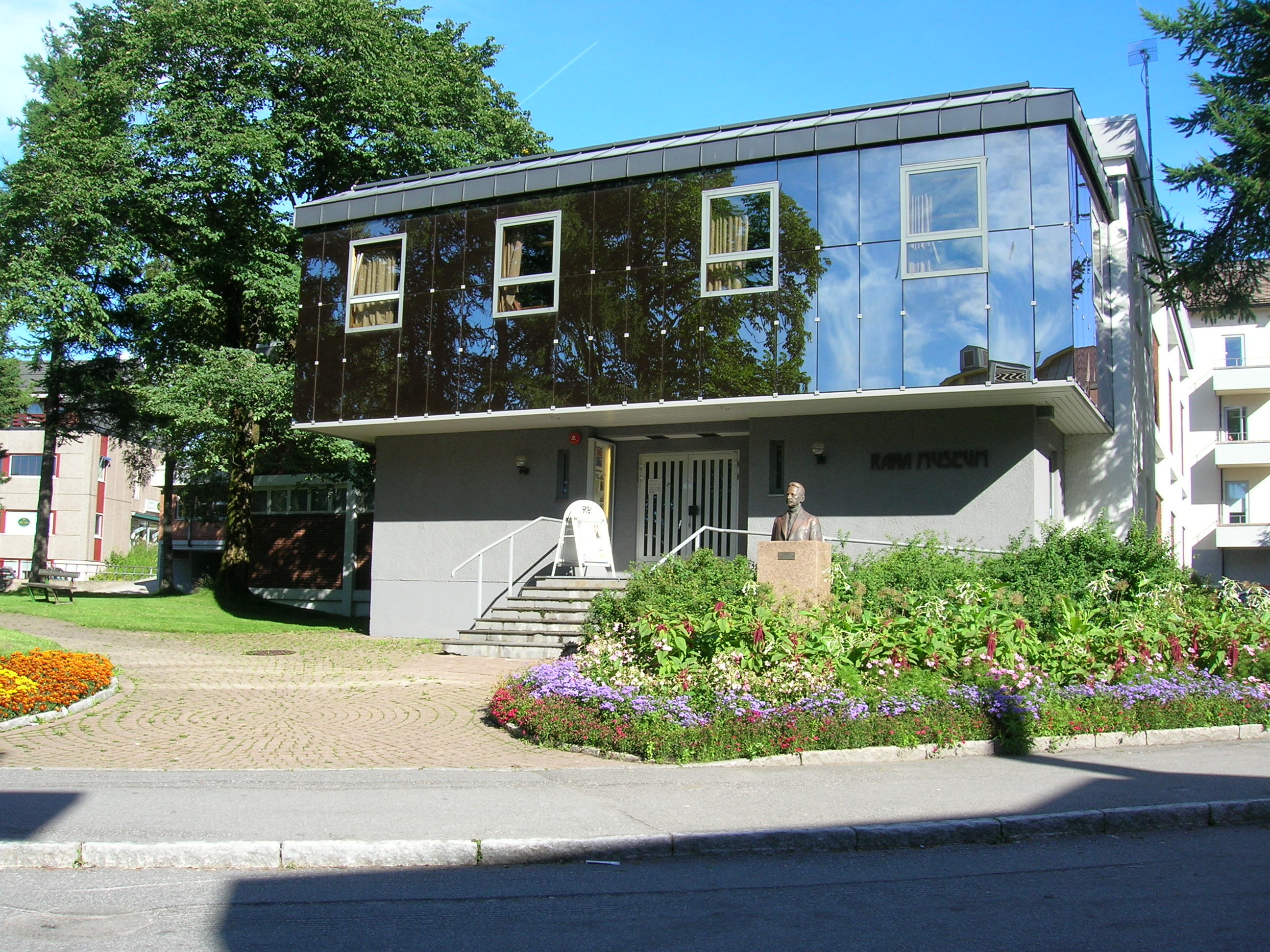
Rana museum, department for cultural history

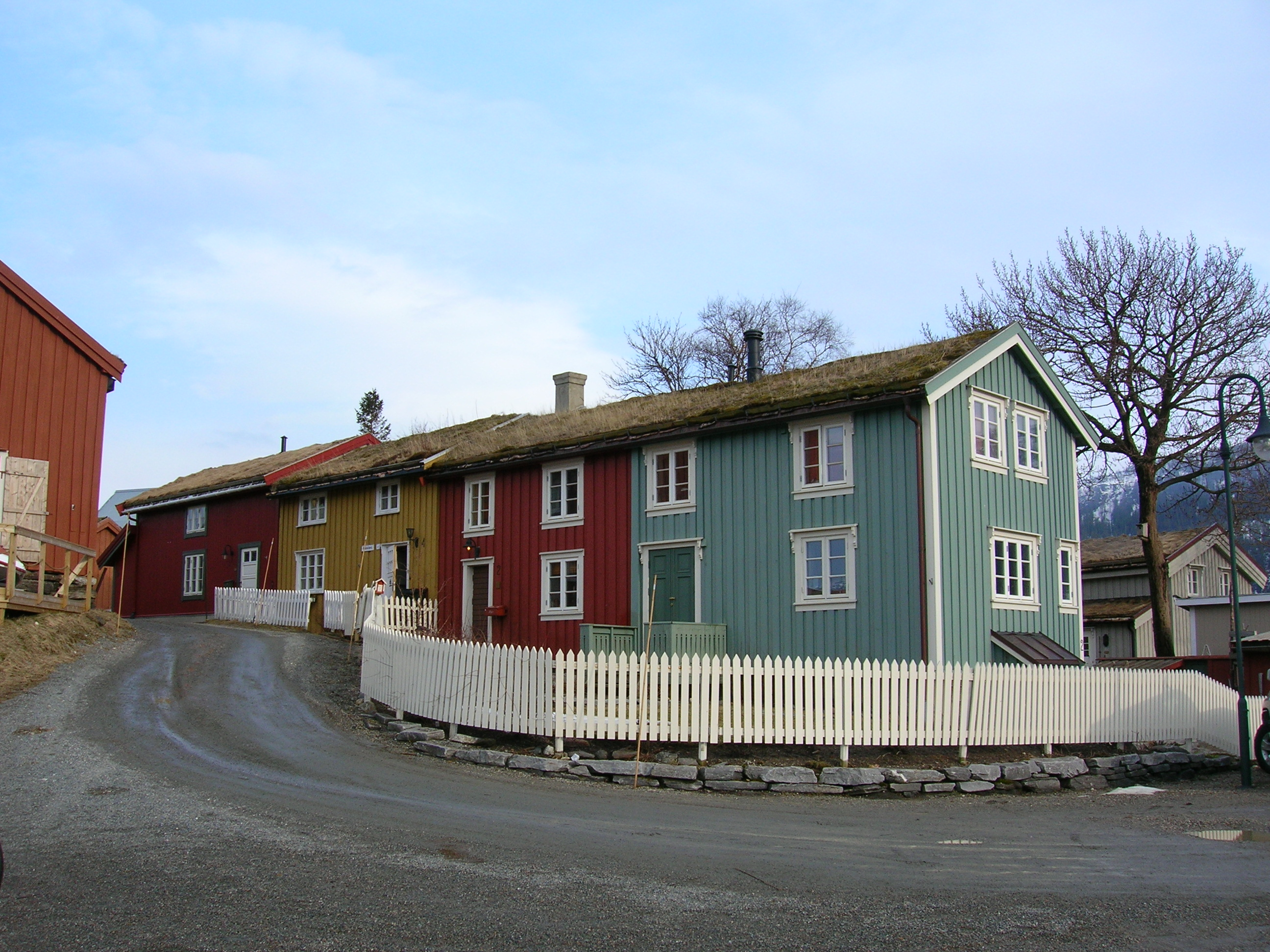
Moholmen in Mo i Rana, 16 April 2007

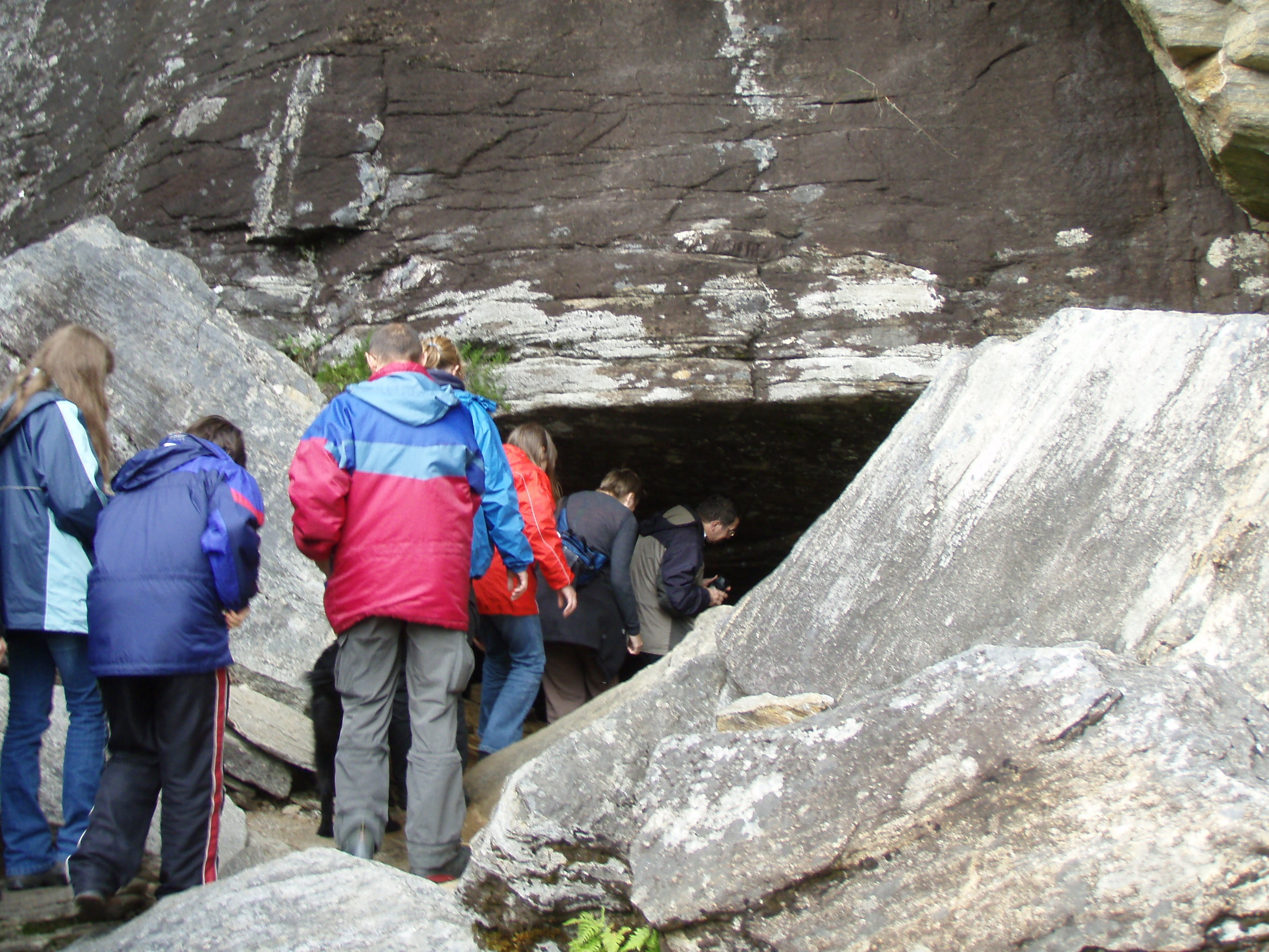
Entrance of the Grønligrotta cave

== Culture ==
- Havmannen, a sculpture made by Antony Gormley (1995), part of Artscape Nordland
- Havmanndagene, an annual multi-cultural festival held the first weekend of May
- Nordland Teater, a regional drama theatre for Nordland County
- Vikafestivalen, an annual pop and rock music festival
- Nordland County library
- National Library of Norway

== Notable people ==
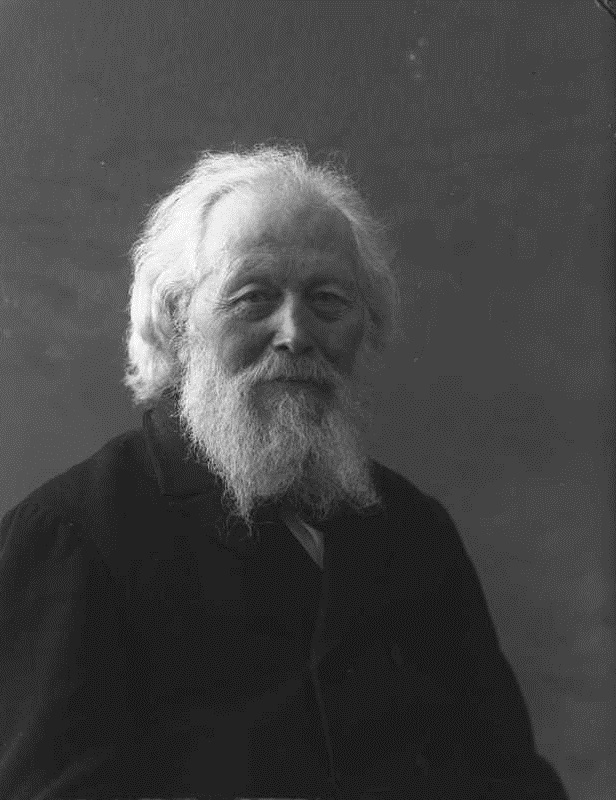
Ole Tobias Olsen, 1908

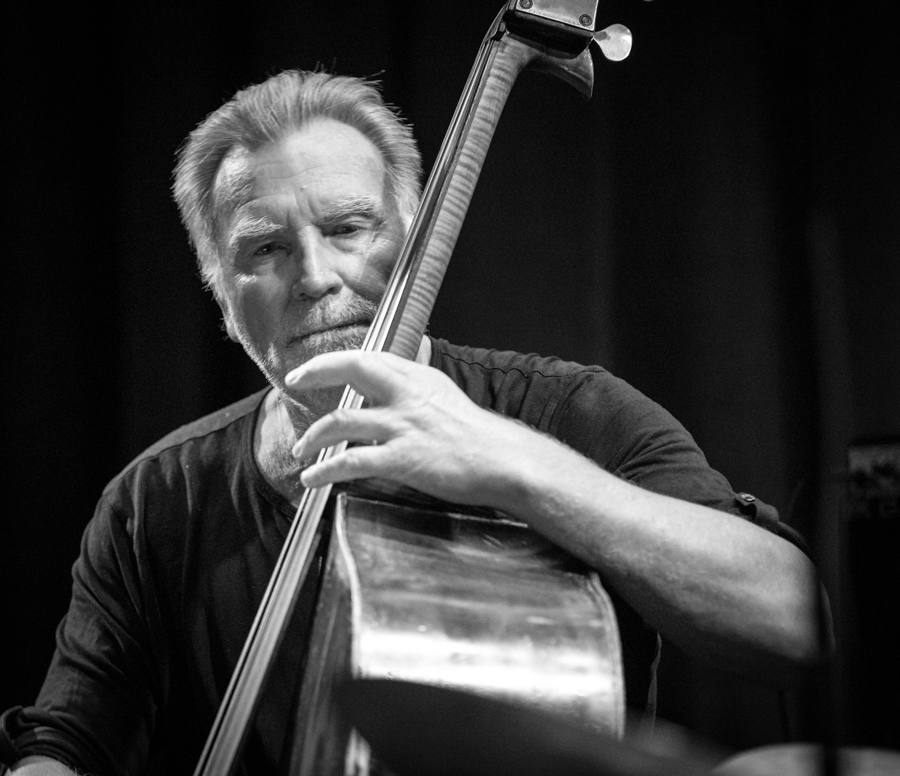
Bjørn Alterhaug, 2017

- Ole Tobias Olsen (1830 in the Dunderland Valley – 1924), teacher and minister and father of the Nordland Line between Trondheim and Bodø
- Nils Hansteen (1855 in Mo i Rana – 1912), painter of landscapes and marine art
- Per Karstensen (1915–2010), educator and politician who was Mayor of Nord-Rana & Rana 1963-1965
- Sverre Bratland (1917 in Utskarpen – 2002), Norwegian military leader
- Egil Øyjord (born 1928 in Mo i Rana), academic and founder of the International Association on Mechanization of Field Experiments (IAMFE)
- Bjørn Alterhaug (born 1945 in Mo i Rana), jazz bassist, composer and professor of music
- Inge Myrvoll (born 1948 in Rana), politician and mayor of Rana & deputy since 2003
- Laila Stien (born 1946), novelist, poet, and author of children's literature who grew up in Rana
- Guttorm Guttormsen (born 1950 in Mo i Rana), jazz musician, arranger, and composer
- Anne Grete Hollup (born 1957 in Mo i Rana), novelist, playwright, and children's writer
- Geir Bjørklund (born 1969 in Mo i Rana), researcher and medical science writer, and editor
- Hans Olav Lahlum (born 1973 in Mo i Rana), historian, crime author, chess player, and politician

=== Sport ===
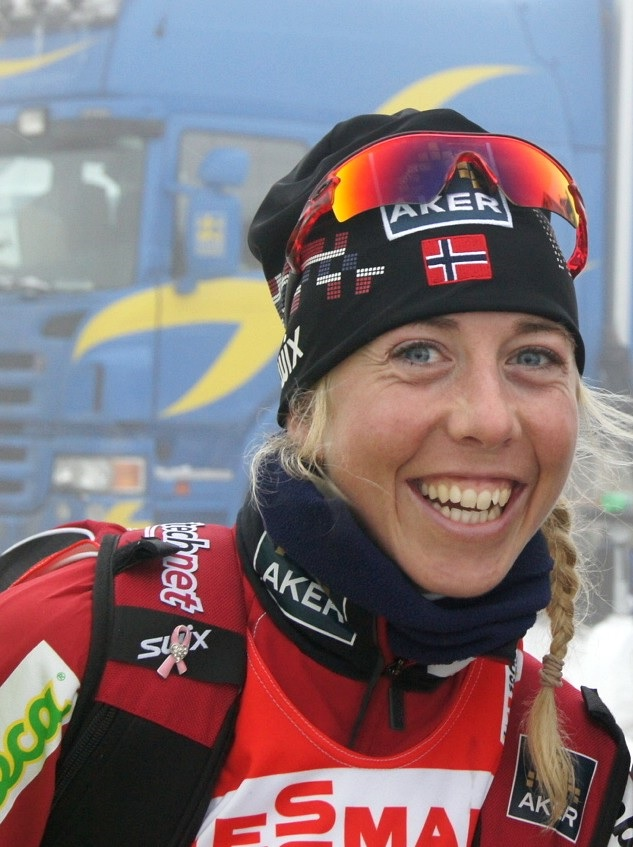
Kristin Størmer Steira, 2012

- Tom Sandberg (born 1955 in Mo i Rana), former Nordic combined skier, gold medallist at the 1984 Winter Olympics
- Trond Sollied (born 1959 in Mo i Rana), football manager and former player with 262 club caps and 15 for Norway
- Elin Nilsen (born 1968 in Mo i Rana), former cross-country skier who was a three time team silver medallist at the 1992, 1994 and 1998 Winter Olympics
- Kenneth Braaten (born 1974), Nordic combined skier and team gold medallist at the 1998 Winter Olympics
- Jan Egil Andresen (born 1978 in Mo i Rana), cross-country skier who competed at the 2006 Winter Olympics
- Marius Erlandsen (born 1979 in Mo i Rana), auto racing driver
- Kristin Størmer Steira (born 1981 in Mo i Rana), retired cross-country skier
- Karianne Bjellånes (born 1986 in Mo i Rana), cross-country skier
- Joar Leifseth Ulsom (born 1987 in Mo i Rana), dog musher
- Martin Bjørnbak (born 1992 in Mo i Rana), footballer with over 250 club caps
- Lisa-Marie Karlseng Utland (born 1992 in Mo i Rana), footballer with over 200 club caps and 51 for Norway
- Emilie Kalkenberg (born 1997 in Mo i Rana), biathlete

== International relations ==
=== Twin towns—sister cities ===
The sister cities of Rana are:

- Løgstør, Nordjylland, Denmark
- Raahe, Northern Ostrobothnia, Finland
- Skellefteå, Västerbotten, Sweden
