= Bogvatnet =

Lake in Rana, Norway

Bogvatnet (Norwegian) Tjoamodisjávrre (Lule Sami)
- Historic: Čoamotisjavri (Lule Sami)
- Interactive map of the lake
- Location: Rana Municipality, Nordland
- Coordinates: 66.6512°N 14.4425°E
- Basin countries: Norway
- Max. length: 4.5 kilometres (2.8 mi)
- Max. width: 1.3 kilometres (0.81 mi)
- Surface area: 3.21 km^{2} (1.24 sq mi)
- Shore length^{1}: 12.59 kilometres (7.82 mi)
- Surface elevation: 661 metres (2,169 ft)
- References: NVE
- ^{1} Shore length is not a well-defined measure.

Bogvatnet (Norwegian) or Tjoamodisjávrre (Lule Sami) is a lake in Rana Municipality in Nordland county, Norway. The lake is located inside the Saltfjellet–Svartisen National Park, about 40 kilometres (25 mi) north of the town of Mo i Rana. The glacial lake is also the headwaters of the Blakkåga river, a tributary to the main river Ranelva.

== See also ==
- List of lakes in Norway
- Geography of Norway
