= Holmvatnet, Rana =

Lake in Rana, Norway

Holmvatnet
- Nedre Fagervollvatnet
- Interactive map of the lake
- Location: Rana Municipality, Nordland
- Coordinates: 66.3434°N 13.6447°E
- Basin countries: Norway
- First flooded: 1970s
- Max. length: 5 kilometres (3.1 mi)
- Max. width: 1.5 kilometres (0.93 mi)
- Surface area: 4.84 km^{2} (1.87 sq mi)
- Surface elevation: 275 metres (902 ft)
- References: NVE

Holmvatnet is a lake and a reservoir in Rana Municipality in Nordland county, Norway. It is located northeast of the villages of Mæla and Myklebustad.

The present lake was formed during the building of the Sjona hydroelectric power station during the early 1970s, when the original Holmvatnet was dammed and flowed together with the lake Nedre Fagervollvatnet further upstream. The reservoir has an area of 4.84-square-kilometre (1.87 sq mi) and the elevation is regulated between 275 and 254.3 metres (902 and 834 ft) above sea level.

== See also ==
- List of lakes in Norway
- Geography of Norway
