= Helgåvatnet =

Lake in Nordland county, Norway

Helgåvatnet Nedre Helgåvatnet
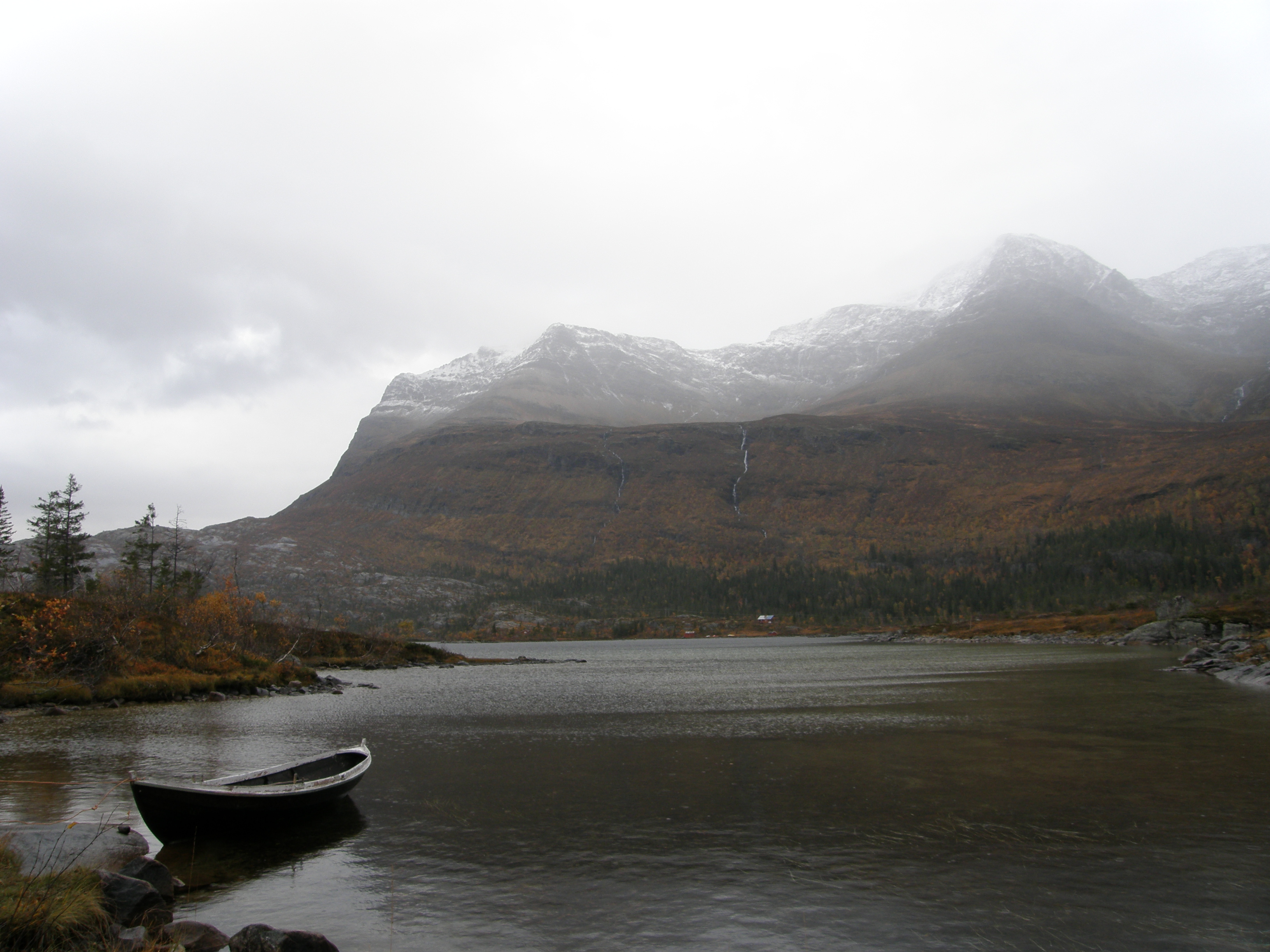
- Interactive map of the lake
- Location: Rana Municipality, Nordland
- Coordinates: 66.3941°N 13.4104°E
- Basin countries: Norway
- Max. length: 4 kilometres (2.5 mi)
- Max. width: 1 kilometre (0.62 mi)
- Surface area: 3.52 km^{2} (1.36 sq mi)
- Shore length^{1}: 12.54 kilometres (7.79 mi)
- Surface elevation: 85 metres (279 ft)
- References: NVE
- ^{1} Shore length is not a well-defined measure.

Helgåvatnet or Nedre Helgåvatnet is a lake in Rana Municipality in Nordland county, Norway. The 3.52-square-kilometre (1.36 sq mi) lake lies about 5 kilometres (3.1 mi) northeast of the village of Flostrand.

== See also ==
- List of lakes in Norway
- Geography of Norway
