= Reingardslivatnet =

Lake in Rana, Norway

- Interactive map of the lake
- Location: Rana Municipality, Nordland
- Coordinates: 66.4382°N 14.1817°E
- Basin countries: Norway
- Max. length: 4.5 kilometres (2.8 mi)
- Max. width: 1.5 kilometres (0.93 mi)
- Surface area: 2.4 km^{2} (0.93 sq mi)
- Shore length^{1}: 15.68 kilometres (9.74 mi)
- Surface elevation: 361 metres (1,184 ft)
- References: NVE
- ^{1} Shore length is not a well-defined measure.

Reingardslivatnet (lit. 'Reindeer Farm Lake') is a lake in Rana Municipality in Nordland county, Norway. The lake lies about 9 kilometres (5.6 mi) north of the village of Røssvoll. It flows out into the river Røvassåga to the east.

== See also ==
- List of lakes in Norway
- Geography of Norway
