= Nedre =

Nedre may refer to:

- Nedre Eggedal, village in Sigdal Municipality in Buskerud county, Norway
- Nedre Eiker Municipality, municipality in Buskerud county, Norway
- Nedre Elvehavn, borough of the city of Trondheim in Trøndelag county, Norway
- Nedre Fagervollvatnet, Norwegian lake that lies in Rana Municipality in Nordland county, Norway
- Nedre Fiplingvatnet, Norwegian lake that lies in Grane Municipality in Nordland county, Norway
- Nedre Heimdalsvatnet, lake which lies in Vågå Municipality and Øystre Slidre Municipality in Innlandet county, Norway
- Nedre Roasten, lake in Femundsmarka National Park in Trøndelag county, Norway
- Nedre Stjørdalen Municipality, former municipality in the old Nord-Trøndelag county, Norway
- Nedre Veikvatnet, Norwegian lake that lies in Sørfold Municipality in Nordland
