= Sverre Bratland =

Norwegian military commander

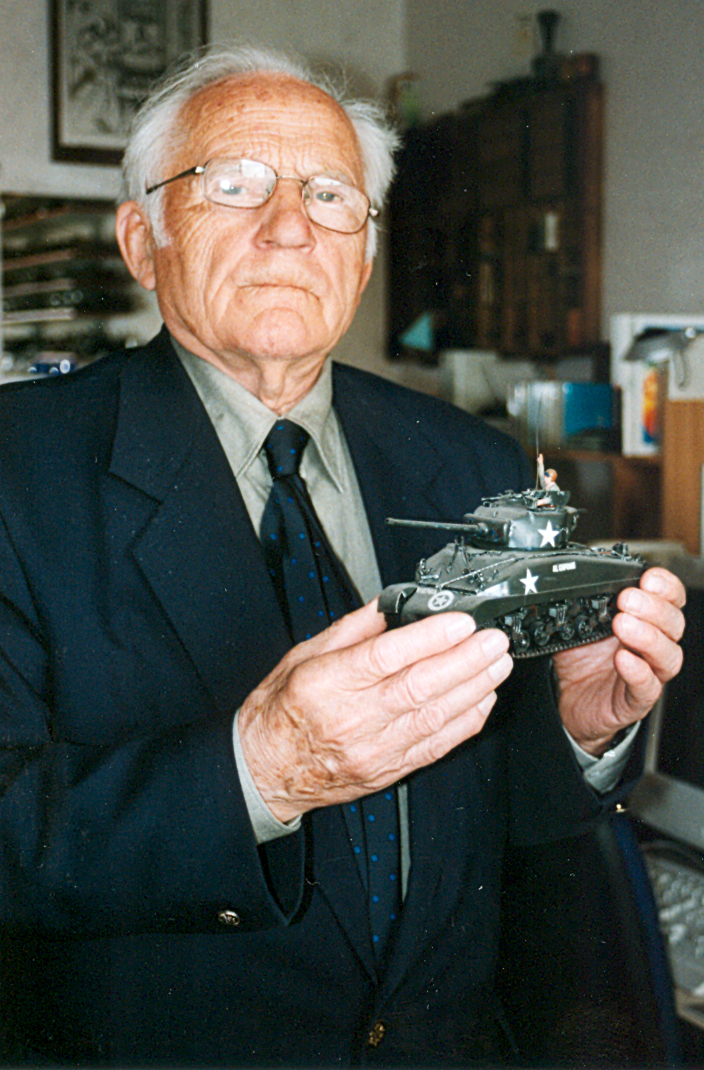
- Sverre Bratland in uniform
- Born: 2 June 1917; Utskarpen, Rana, Norway
- Died: 29 April 2002 (aged 84)
- Allegiance: Norway
- Branch: Norwegian Army
- Service years: 1930s–1982
- Rank: Major General
- Commands: Commander of Ground Forces, South Norway (1977–1982)
- Conflicts: Norwegian Campaign, Normandy campaign, Battle of Caen, Operation Market Garden
- Awards: Military Cross; * St. Olav's Medal with Oak Branch  * Norwegian Defence Medal  * British War Medal 1939–1945  * British Defence Medal * Chevalier of the Légion d'honneur
- Other work: Instructor at the Norwegian Military Academy

Sverre Bratland (2 June 1917 – 29 April 2002) was a Norwegian military leader.

== Biography ==
He grew up at a farm in Utskarpen in Rana Municipality, and took his military education in Harstad at the Norwegian 6th Division Under-Officers' Training School. He was of sergeant rank when Norway was invaded by Germany on 9 April 1940. His garrison was ordered to fight with the outbreak of the Narvik campaign. Bratland first fought in the Battle of Gratangen. In the next month he was stationed in Bodø, where he was wounded during a German air attack. He fled to England via Sweden in 1942, and was subsequently commissioned into the British Army, in the 4th Battalion of the King's Shropshire Light Infantry. He would serve in Normandy, landing on 13 June 1944. He was injured in the Battle for Caen, but quickly returned to the field. On 22 September 1944, during the crossing of key canals in the Netherlands, Bratland led a platoon attack near Asten, for which he was awarded the Military Cross. When approaching Germany, he headed a company. However he was gravely injured on 5 April 1945, and remained hospitalized until the war's end. Bratland was also awarded the St. Olav's Medal With Oak Branch and the Defence Medal as well as the British War Medal 1939–1945 and Defence Medal. He was appointed Chevalier de la Légion d'honneur in 1980.

He went on to have a successful career in the Norwegian army after the war. He served as battalion chief of the brigade in South Norway from 1961 to 1964, then chief of staff in Northern Norway. He then served as acting chief of staff of the NATO North Command before serving as commander of ground forces in South Norway from 1977 to 1982. He attained the rank of colonel in 1966 and major general in 1972. After retirement he worked part-time at the Norwegian Military Academy. He also visited Normandy several times with various delegations. He died in 2002.
