= Flostrand =

Village in Rana Municipality, Norway

- Village
- Interactive map of Flostrand
- Location within Nordland Location within Norway
- Coordinates: 66.3363°N 13.3686°E
- Country: Norway
- Region: Northern Norway
- County: Nordland
- District: Helgeland
- Municipality: Rana Municipality
- Elevation: 6 m (20 ft)
- Time zone: UTC+01:00 (CET)
  - Summer (DST): UTC+02:00 (CEST)
- Post Code: 8725 Utskarpen

Flostrand is a village in Rana Municipality in Nordland county, Norway. It is located along Norwegian County Road 17 on the northern bank of the Sjona fjord.

The district surrounding the inner part of the Sjona fjord originally belonged to Nesna Municipality. On 1 January 1964 this district (population: 543) was merged with the town of Mo i Rana, Nord-Rana Municipality, and the northern part of Sør-Rana Municipality to create the new Rana Municipality.
