= Blerekvatnet =

Lake in Rana, Norway

- Interactive map of the lake
- Location: Rana Municipality, Nordland
- Coordinates: 66.3313°N 15.0659°E
- Basin countries: Norway
- Max. length: 3.8 kilometres (2.4 mi)
- Max. width: 2 kilometres (1.2 mi)
- Surface area: 2.61 km^{2} (1.01 sq mi)
- Shore length^{1}: 31.41 kilometres (19.52 mi)
- Surface elevation: 681 metres (2,234 ft)
- References: NVE
- ^{1} Shore length is not a well-defined measure.

Blerekvatnet is a lake in Rana Municipality in Nordland county, Norway. It lies at the northern base of the mountain Junkerfjellet, about 40 kilometres (25 mi) straight east of the town of Mo i Rana.

== See also ==
- List of lakes in Norway
- Geography of Norway
