= Langvatnet (Rana) =

Lake in Rana, Norway

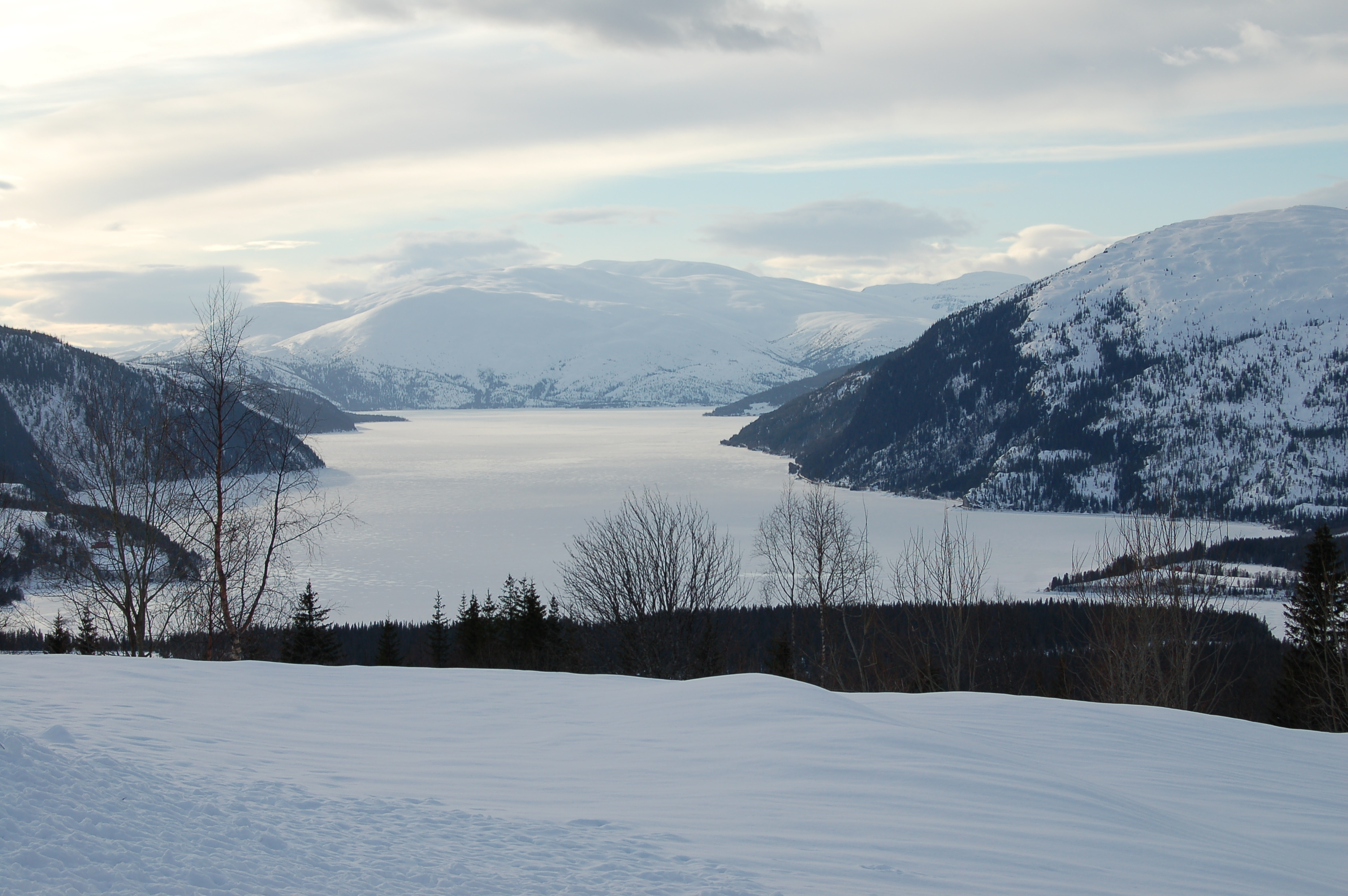
- Interactive map of the lake
- Location: Rana Municipality, Nordland
- Coordinates: 66.3708°N 14.0968°E
- Basin countries: Norway
- Max. length: 17 kilometres (11 mi)
- Max. width: 3.5 kilometres (2.2 mi)
- Surface area: 26.38 km^{2} (10.19 sq mi)
- Shore length^{1}: 64 kilometres (40 mi)
- Surface elevation: 43 metres (141 ft)
- References: NVE
- ^{1} Shore length is not a well-defined measure.

Langvatnet is a lake in Rana Municipality in Nordland county, Norway. The 26.38-square-kilometre (10.19 sq mi) lake lies just northwest of the town of Mo i Rana. The lake flows out into the river Langvassåga just north of Mo i Rana Airport, Røssvoll. The lake used as a reservoir for the Langvatn hydroelectric power plant in the village of Ytteren, just down the hill from the lake.

== See also ==
- List of lakes in Norway
- Geography of Norway
