= Vikafestivalen =

Vikafestivalen was a Norwegian pop and rock festival held at Mo i Rana in northern Norway. It has succeeded Sjonstock, a festival arranged in the outskirts of Mo I Rana every year for 10 years (1995–2005) until it was moved closer to the city and renamed Vikafestivalen (2006). In December 2008 the festival board announced that the festival was cancelled.

== History ==
The Sjonstock festival started out as a birthday celebration in Sjona outside the city of Mo i Rana, but fast became immensely popular among local youths. Soon enough they attracted big national performers, and grew steadily each year.

The festival manager was Mads Mjelle, he was also the general manager of the Kulturapparatet foundation which co-organised the festival. Otherwise, all operations were on a voluntary basis. In 2008, the festival received NOK 100,000 in support from the Norwegian Cultural Council.

On 20 December 2008 the festival management announced through Rana Blad that the festival had to be canceled due to financial problems. Managing director Mads Mjelle was convicted in 2012 for having failed to ensure that the accounts for the foundation were kept in accordance with the law.

== Key performers ==
2007: Lauryn Hill, Sivert Høyem, Europe, BigBang, Satyricon, Karpe Diem

2006: Motörhead, Dum Dum Boys, Turbonegro, Håkan Hellström, Marit Larsen, Minor Majority, Mew

Sjonstock:

2005:We, Madrugada, TNT

2004:BigBang, Sondre Lerche, Side Brok

2003: Dum Dum Boys, Gothminister, Bertine Zetlitz, Thomas Dybdahl, John Doe, Gatas Parlament

2002:Björn Rosenström, Tungtvann, Surferosa

2001:Cadillac, Bel Canto

2000:Madrugada, BigBang

1999:Locomotives, Astroburger, Zuma

1998:Hollow, Oddpopp

1997:Fru Pedersen

1996:Jokers Grind, Suckers Market

1995:White Wings
