= Myklebustad =

Village in Rana Municipality, Norway

Myklebustad Myklebostad
- Village
- Interactive map of Myklebustad
- Location within Nordland Location within Norway
- Coordinates: 66.3048°N 13.4923°E
- Country: Norway
- Region: Northern Norway
- County: Nordland
- District: Helgeland
- Municipality: Rana Municipality
- Elevation: 12 m (39 ft)
- Time zone: UTC+01:00 (CET)
  - Summer (DST): UTC+02:00 (CEST)
- Post Code: 8725 Utskarpen

Myklebustad is a village in Rana Municipality in Nordland county, Norway. It is located along Norwegian County Road 17 on the southern bank of the Sjona fjord, just west of the villages of Sjonbotn and Utskarpen. Sjona Church is located in the western part of Myklebustad, serving the western part of Rana Municipality.

The district surrounding the inner part of the Sjona fjord originally belonged to Nesna Municipality. On 1 January 1964, this district (population: 543) was merged with the town of Mo i Rana, Nord-Rana Municipality, and the northern part of Sør-Rana Municipality to create the new Rana Municipality.
