= Litlumvatnet =

Lake in Sweden and Norway

Litlumvatnet (Norwegian); Lill-Uman (Swedish); Jovsjaevrie (Southern Sami)
- Interactive map of the lake
- Location: Rana in Nordland; Storuman in Västerbotten
- Coordinates: 66.1541°N 14.9781°E
- Basin countries: Norway and Sweden
- Max. length: 4 kilometres (2.5 mi)
- Max. width: 2 kilometres (1.2 mi)
- Surface area: 5.24 km^{2} (2.02 sq mi) (with 1.8 km² in Norway, the rest is in Sweden)
- Shore length^{1}: 13.71 kilometres (8.52 mi)
- Surface elevation: 629 metres (2,064 ft)
- References: NVE
- ^{1} Shore length is not a well-defined measure.

Litlumvatnet (Norwegian), Lill-Uman (Swedish), or Jovsjaevrie (Southern Sami) is a lake on the border of Norway and Sweden. The Norwegian side lies in Rana Municipality in Nordland county and the Swedish side lies in Storuman Municipality in Västerbotten County. The lake lies about 40 kilometres (25 mi) southeast of the town of Mo i Rana. The lake is 5.24 square kilometres (2.02 sq mi) and about 1.8 square kilometres (0.69 sq mi) lies inside Norway and the rest lies in Sweden.

== See also ==
- List of lakes in Norway
- Geography of Norway
