= Gubbeltåga =

River in Rana, Norway

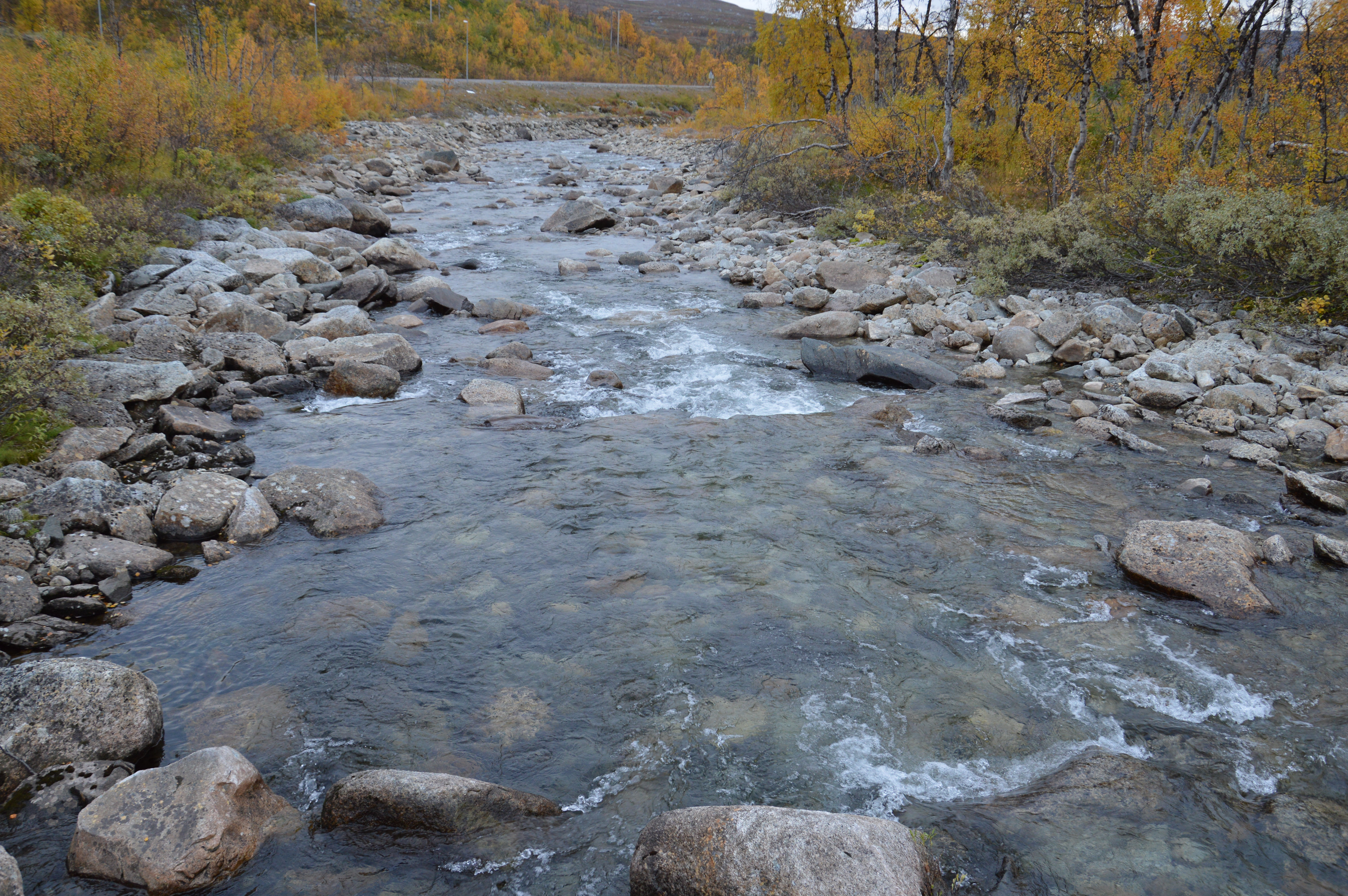
Gubbeltåga on September 25, 2012

Gubbeltåga (Lule Sámi: Gubbeltædno) is a river in Rana Municipality in Nordland county, Norway, which flows in a southern and southwestern direction. The river begins at the drainage divide on the Saltfjellet plateau in north. On its direction manly southwards, it meets and becomes a part of Randalselva, which has its beginning in the norwegian-swedish border-regions. At Elvmøthei in Dunderlandsdalen, Randalselva then meets Virvasselva and thus forms the beginning of Ranelva.

The name is of sami origin. Gubbelt means «valley in the mountain», and ædno means «large river». Gubbeltåga is first mentioned in written records in 1742, during legal deposititions on Selfors and in Gildeskål. These were connected to the drawing of the borders between Norway and Sweden after the Great Northern War, a process leading to two different laws of the border in 1752.
