= Sjonbotn =

Village in Rana Municipality, Norway

Sjonbotn Mæla
- Village
- Interactive map of Sjonbotn
- Location within Nordland Location within Norway
- Coordinates: 66.3063°N 13.5663°E
- Country: Norway
- Region: Northern Norway
- County: Nordland
- District: Helgeland
- Municipality: Rana Municipality
- Elevation: 5 m (16 ft)
- Time zone: UTC+01:00 (CET)
  - Summer (DST): UTC+02:00 (CEST)
- Post Code: 8725 Utskarpen

Sjonbotn is a village in Rana Municipality in Nordland county, Norway. It is located along Norwegian County Road 17 at the eastern end of the Sjona fjord, about 2 kilometres (1.2 mi) north of the villages of Utskarpen and Myklebustad.

The small, rural village area sits at the end of the fjord. There is a large marshy river delta at the shoreline that is known as Mæla, a name that is also used for the village area as well.

The district surrounding the inner part of the Sjona fjord originally belonged to Nesna Municipality. On 1 January 1964, this district (population: 543) was merged with the town of Mo i Rana, Nord-Rana Municipality, and the northern part of Sør-Rana Municipality to create the new Rana Municipality.
