= Geir Waage =

Norwegian politician (born 1967)

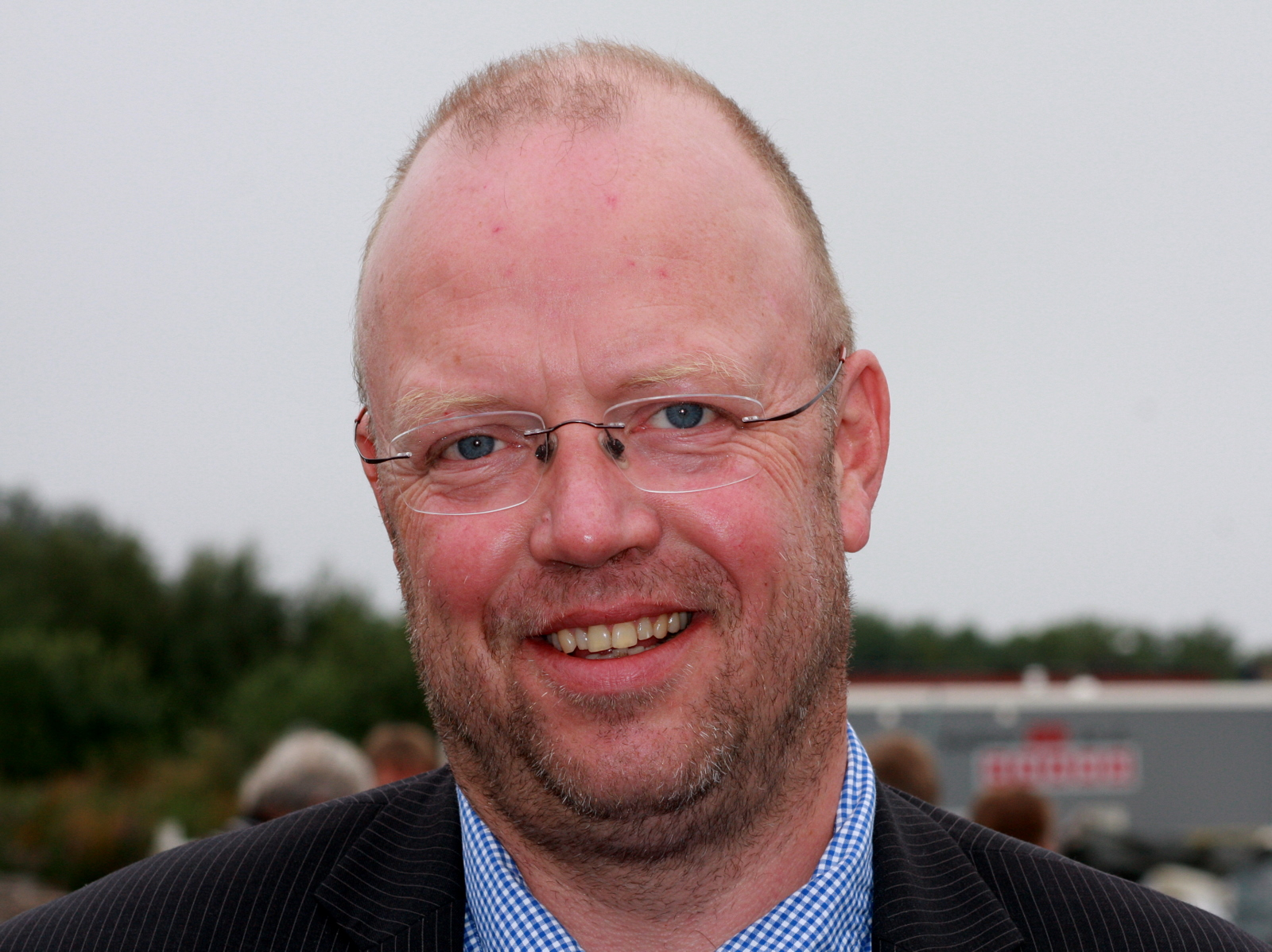
- Waage in 2010

Mayor of Rana Municipality

Personal details
- Political party: Norwegian Labour Party

Geir Norten Waage (born January 21, 1967) is a Norwegian politician for the Norwegian Labour Party.

Since 2007 he is the mayor of Rana Municipality. Waage was one of the four mayors that fronted his municipality and seven others in the Terra Securities scandal.
