= Per Karstensen =

Norwegian educator and politician

Per Magnus Karstensen (22 October 1915 – 24 December 2010) was a Norwegian educator and politician for the Labour Party.

== Career ==
He was born in Mosjøen. He attended primary school in Ytteren, then a folk high school from 1931 to 1932. He studied at Nesna Teacher's College, took the examen artium in 1943 and graduated with the cand.philol. degree in 1951. He worked as a school teacher in Bodin Municipality and Nord-Rana Municipality from 1940 to 1944, then in Mo i Rana from 1944. He was promoted to school inspector in 1961, and served as school director of Nordland from 1971 to 1973.

He became involved in politics, and was deputy mayor of Nord-Rana municipality during the terms 1945–1947 and 1959–1963, mayor of Nord-Rana from 1963 to 1964 and of its successor Rana Municipality from 1964 to 1965. From 1963 to 1967 he was a member of Nordland county council. He chaired his local party chapter from 1951 to 1952, and the regional chapter from 1955 to 1958. From 1960 to 1963 he was a member of the Schei Committee. He was elected to the Parliament of Norway from Nordland in 1965, and was re-elected on three occasions in 1969, 1973 and 1977. He chaired the Standing Committee on Education, Research and Church Affairs from 1969 to 1973 and was Vice President of the Odelsting from 1977 to 1981.

He was a member of the Hålogaland Court of Appeal from 1946 to 1965. He was also a board member of Riksteatret from 1965 to 1981, Biblioteksentralen from 1969 to 1976, the bank Nordlandsbanken from 1970 to 1978 and the newspaper Rana Blad from 1983 to 1987. He was a member of the Norwegian UNESCO Commission from 1973 to 1977 and the Broadcasting Council from 1982 to 1986. He issued several books on local history.
