= Mo i Rana Airport, Røssvoll =

Mo i Rana Airport, Røssvoll Mo i Rana lufthavn, Røssvoll

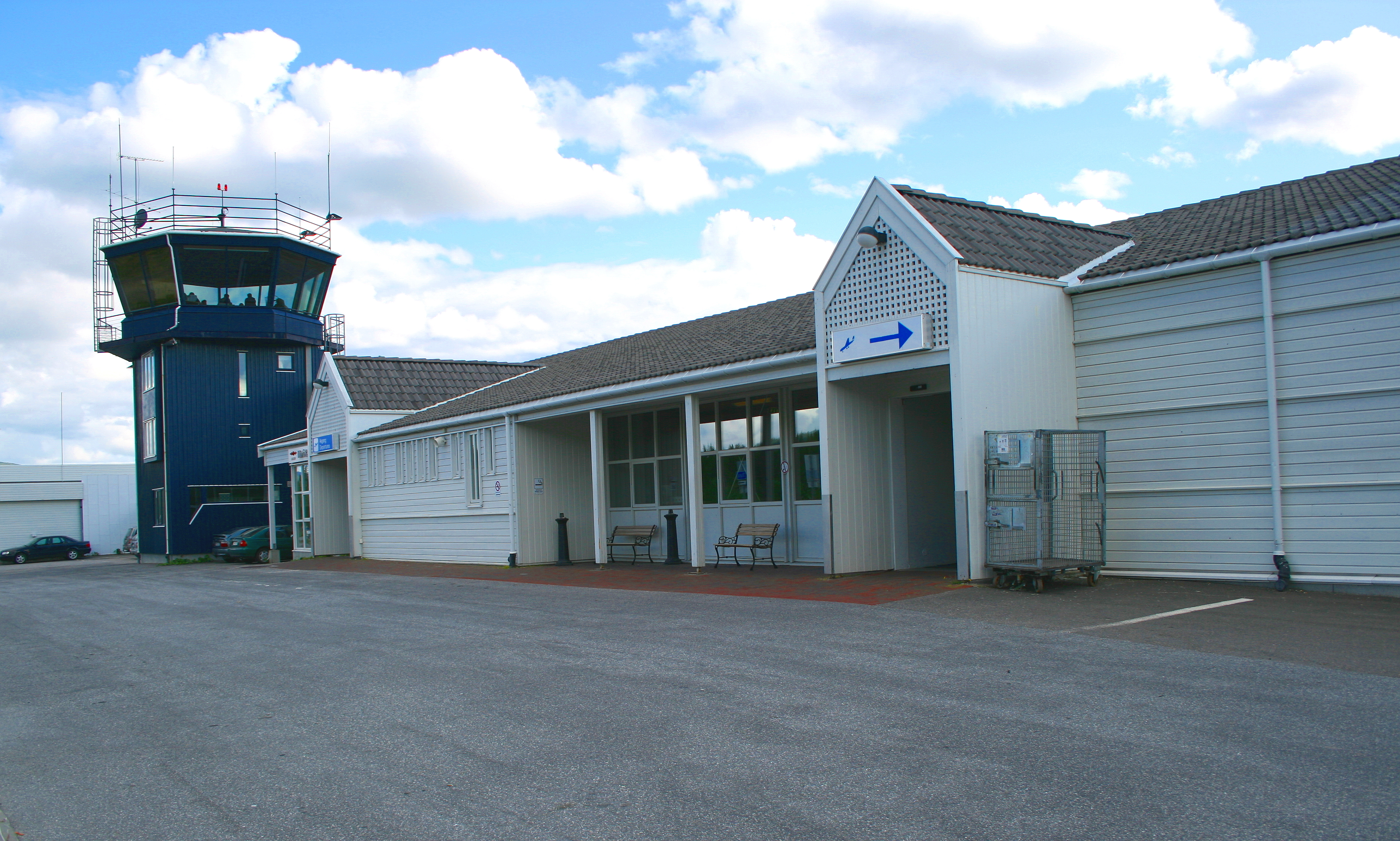
- IATA: MQN; ICAO: ENRA

Summary
- Airport type: Public
- Operator: Avinor
- Serves: Mo i Rana
- Location: Røssvoll, Rana, Norway
- Opened: 1968
- Elevation AMSL: 229 ft (70 m)
- Coordinates: 66°21′50″N 014°18′06″E
- Website: avinor.no

Map
- Location in Norway

Runways
Direction	Length		Surface
Direction	ft	m	Surface
14/32	2,858	871	Asphalt

Statistics (2014)
- Passengers: 104,474
- Aircraft movements: 7,374
- Cargo (tonnes): 13

Mo i Rana Airport (Norwegian: Mo i Rana lufthavn; IATA: MQN, ICAO: ENRA) is a regional airport serving the town of Mo i Rana in Rana in Nordland county, Norway. The airport is located about 10 kilometres (6.2 mi) outside the town in the village of Røssvoll. In 2014 Mo i Rana Airport served 104,474 passengers. It is operated by Avinor.

== Service ==
The airport is served by Widerøe with Dash 8-100 and Dash 8-200 aircraft connecting the community to Bodø, Trondheim, and other communities in Nordland and Trøndelag counties. The routes are operated on public service obligation with the Norwegian Ministry of Transport and Communications. The runway is too short for flights with enough fuel to reach Oslo (in 2017 flights with a fuel stop were introduced, later cancelled. Flying a small aircraft all the way to Oslo is slow due to slow speed and a landing needed anyway, and expensive due to few passengers).

== Airlines and destinations ==
Airlines	Destinations
Widerøe	Bodø, Mosjøen, Namsos, Trondheim

== Statistics ==
Annual passenger traffic
Year	Passengers	% Change
2025	112,417	▲19.8%
2024	93,876	▼ -17.3%
2023	113,577	▲3.1%
2022	110,118	▲37.4%
2021	80,121	▲39.3%
2020	57,524	▼ -45.9%
2019	106,316	▼ -3.0%
2018	109,660	▼ -8.8%
2017	120,239	▼ -5.6%
2016	127,404	▲6.5%
2015	119,641	

== Ground transportation ==
The airport is located in Røssvoll about 20 minutes north-east of the town along the E6. There are no buses to the airport, but taxis are available. Rental cars are available in the town of Mo i Rana.

== Replacement ==
Since at least 2002 there has been ideas of building an airport near Mo i Rana and nearby cities with a large enough runway to fly mid-size jet aircraft directly to Oslo, and thereby reducing the cost of travel to Northern Helgeland. It is not possible to extend the present short runway at Røssvoll. There has been support in principle from the government, but it took several years of delays and redoing plans, but in March 2021 the plans were given go-ahead. On 26 September 2022, construction works started with a ceremony.
