= Røssvoll =

Village in Rana Municipality, Norway

- Village
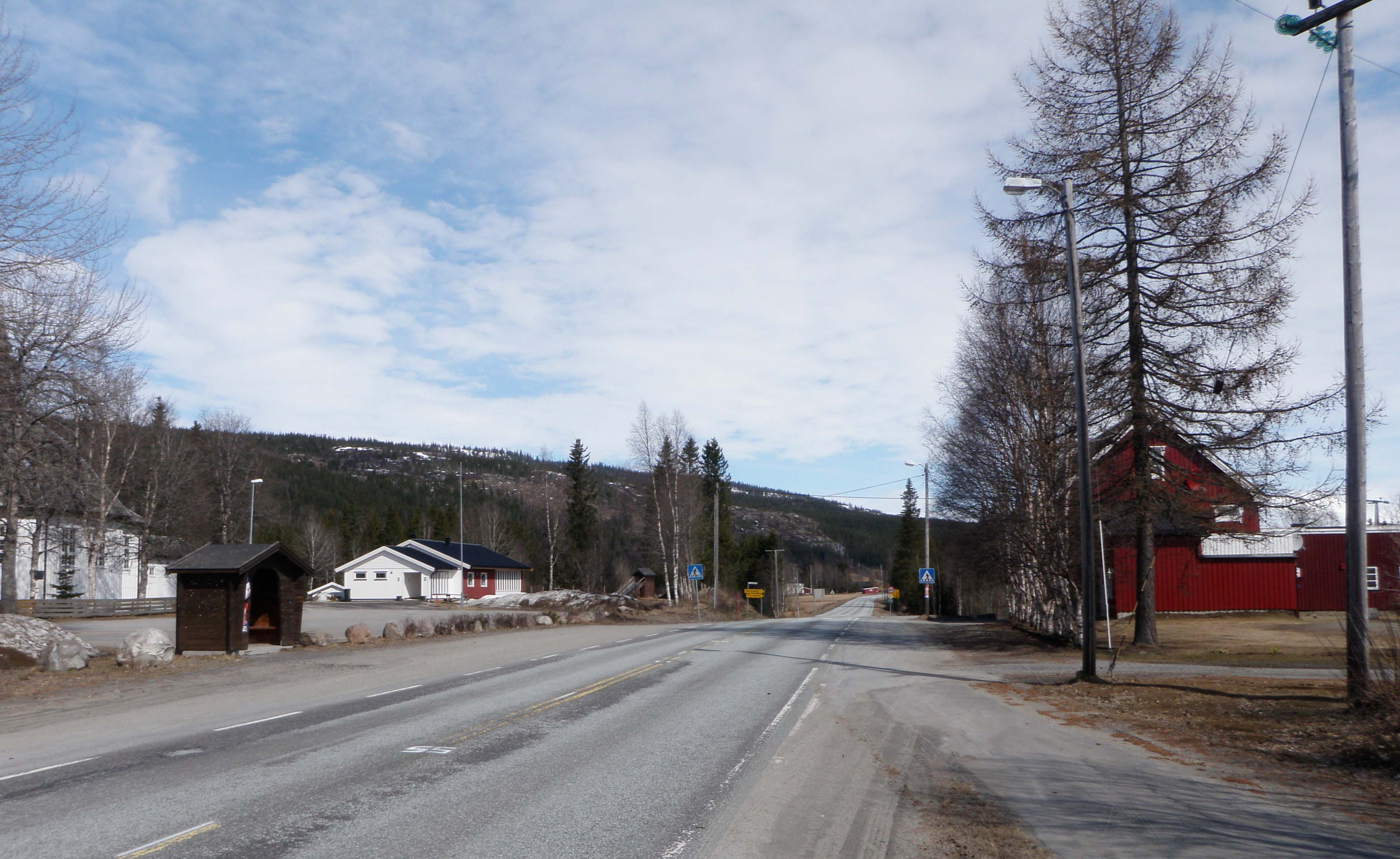
- View of the village (Røssvoll Church to the left)
- Interactive map of Røssvoll
- Location within Nordland Location within Norway
- Coordinates: 66.3586°N 14.3249°E
- Country: Norway
- Region: Northern Norway
- County: Nordland
- District: Helgeland
- Municipality: Rana Municipality
- Elevation: 46 m (151 ft)
- Time zone: UTC+01:00 (CET)
  - Summer (DST): UTC+02:00 (CEST)
- Post Code: 8615 Skonseng

Røssvoll is a village in Rana Municipality in Nordland county, Norway. The village is about 10 kilometres (6.2 mi) north-east of the town of Mo i Rana. The village is on the north side of the river Ranelva (the village of Skonseng lies on the south side of the river). The European route E06 highway passes through the village, passing right by Røssvoll Church in the centre of the village. Mo i Rana Airport, Røssvoll is also here.
