= Utskarpen =

Village in Rana Municipality, Norway

- Village
- Interactive map of Utskarpen
- Location within Nordland Location within Norway
- Coordinates: 66.2901°N 13.5804°E
- Country: Norway
- Region: Northern Norway
- County: Nordland
- District: Helgeland
- Municipality: Rana Municipality
- Elevation: 2 m (6.6 ft)
- Time zone: UTC+01:00 (CET)
  - Summer (DST): UTC+02:00 (CEST)
- Post Code: 8725 Utskarpen

Utskarpen is a village in Rana Municipality in Nordland county, Norway, about 37 kilometres (23 mi) west of the town of Mo i Rana. The village is located at the end of the Utskarpen fjord, an arm of the main Ranfjorden. On the western side of Utskarpen is the intersection with Norwegian County Road 17 and Norwegian County Road 12. The neighboring villages are Sjonbotn to the north and Myklebustad to the west.

Utskarpen has a kindergarten, a primary and secondary school, and a nursing home. The Utskarpen Museum was opened on 23 October 1999. The village has been in the three municipalities. Starting in 1839 it was part of Hemnes Municipality, then in 1929 it became a part of Sør-Rana Municipality, and then in 1964 it was merged into Rana Municipality.
