= Sjona =

Fjord in Nordland, Norway

- Interactive map of the fjord
- Location: Nordland county, Norway
- Coordinates: 66.30315°N 13.28813°E
- Type: Fjord
- Basin countries: Norway
- Max. length: 26 kilometres (16 mi)
- Max. depth: 636 metres (2,087 ft)

Sjona is a fjord in Nordland county, Norway. The 26-kilometre (16 mi) fjord begins in Rana Municipality and flows to the west through Nesna Municipality and Lurøy Municipality into the sea. The islands of Handnesøya and Tomma lie at the mouth of the fjord. The deepest part of the fjord reaches 636 metres (2,087 ft) below sea level. Norwegian County Road 17 follows the entire coast of the fjord. Villages along the shore of the fjord include Flostrand, Mæla, and Myklebustad.

== Media gallery ==
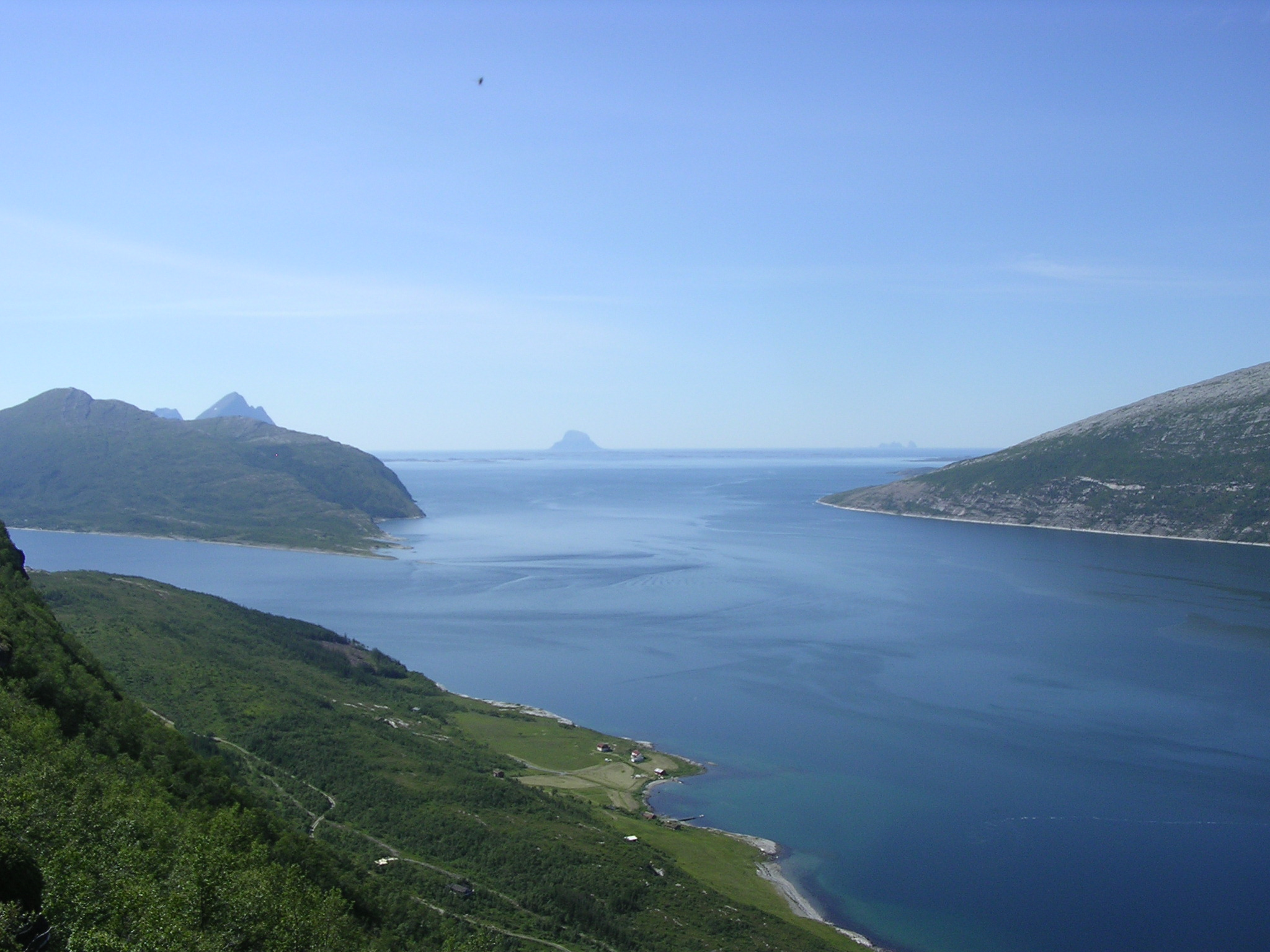
Outer part seen from the south; Handnesøya to the left

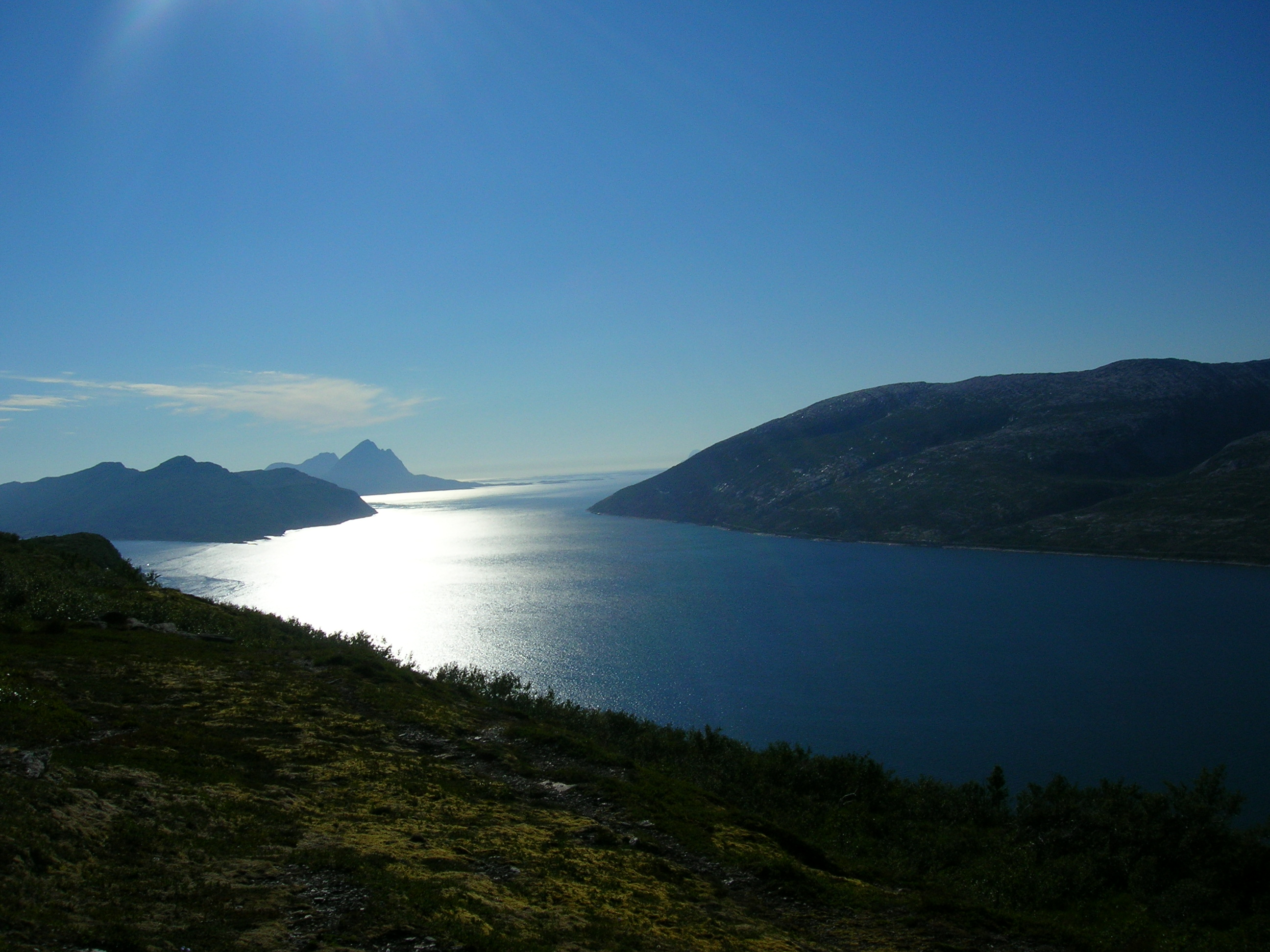
Outer part seen from the south

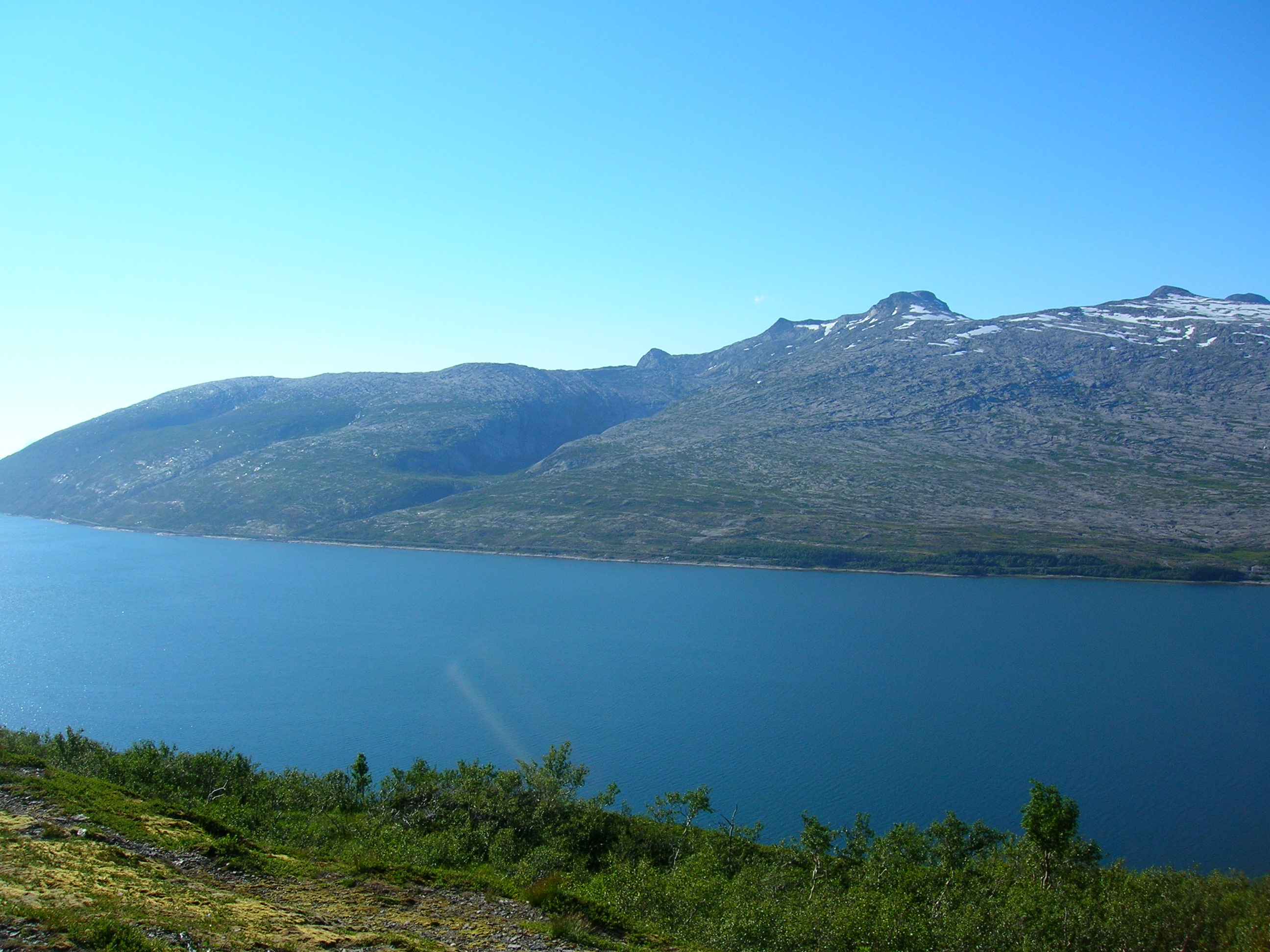
Middle part seen from the south

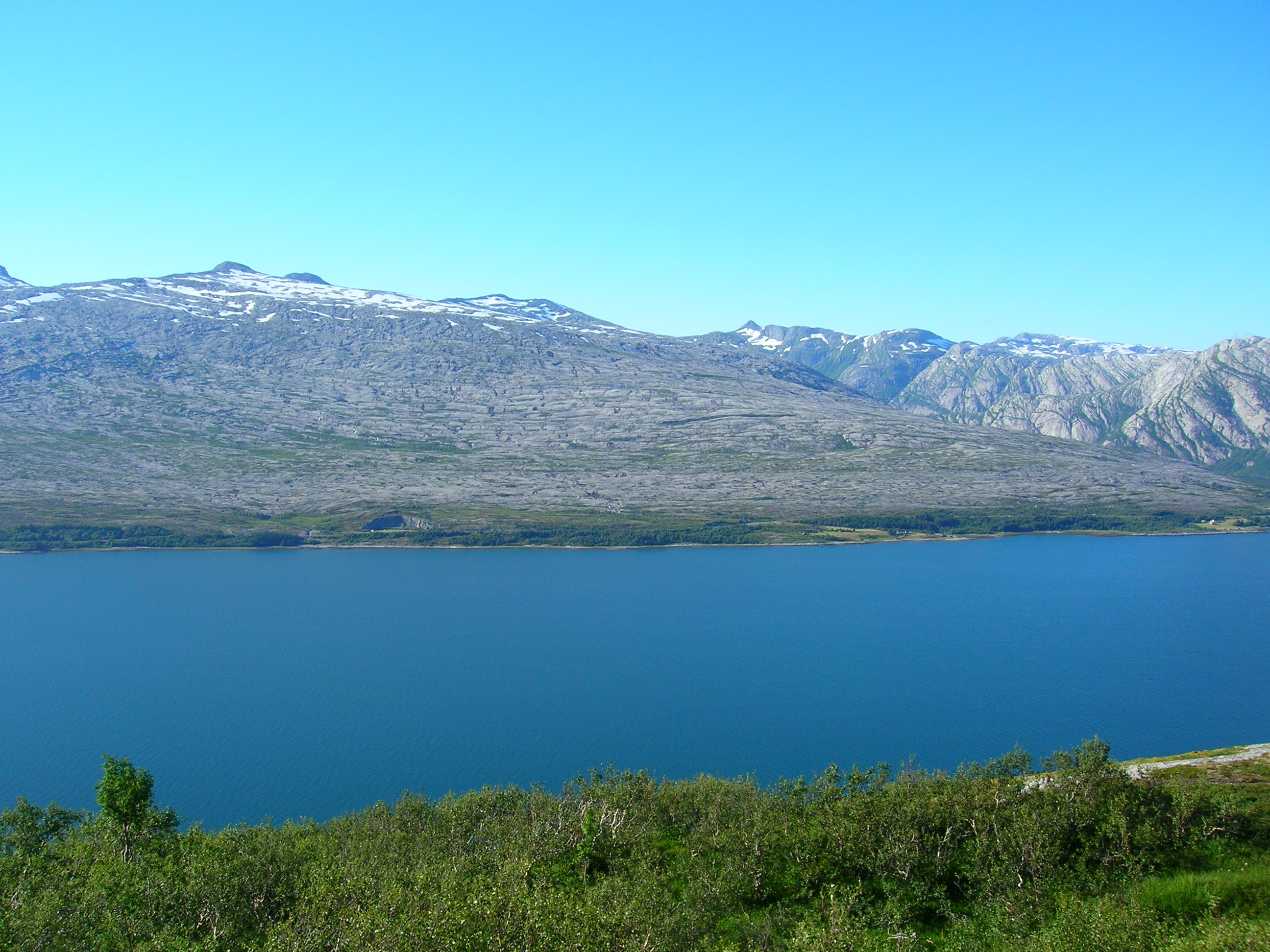
Middle part seen from the south

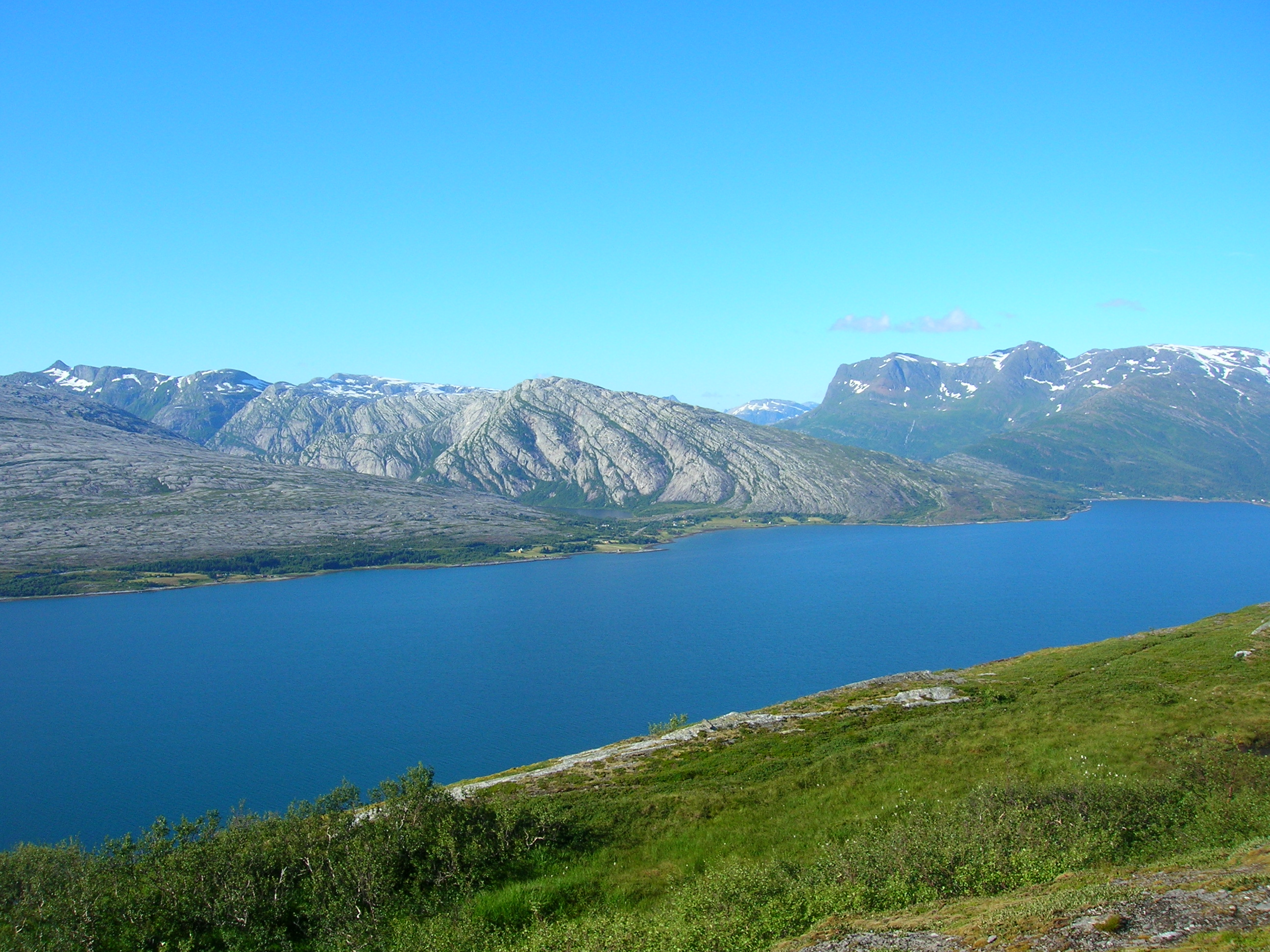
Inner part seen from the south

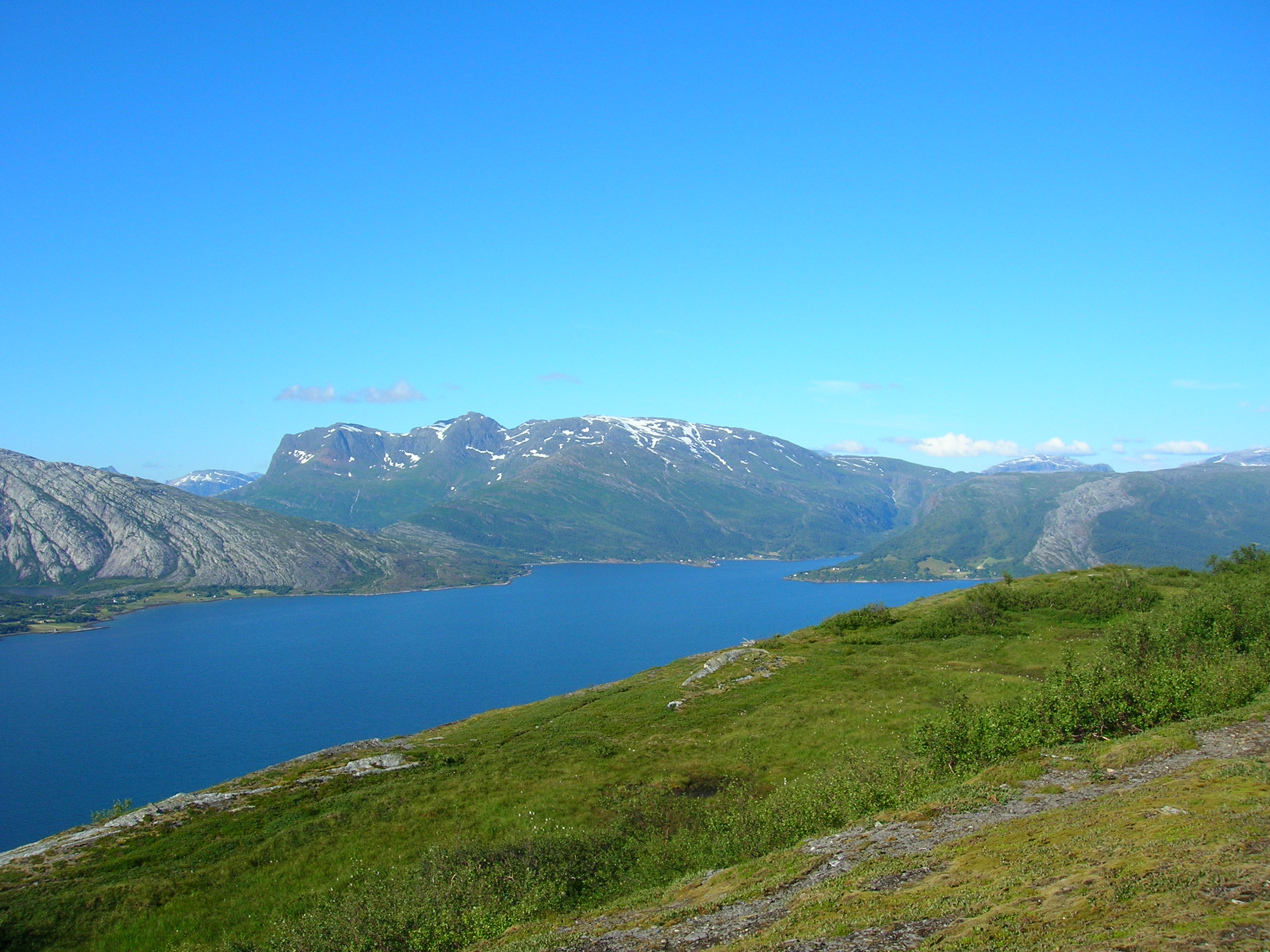
Inner part seen from the south

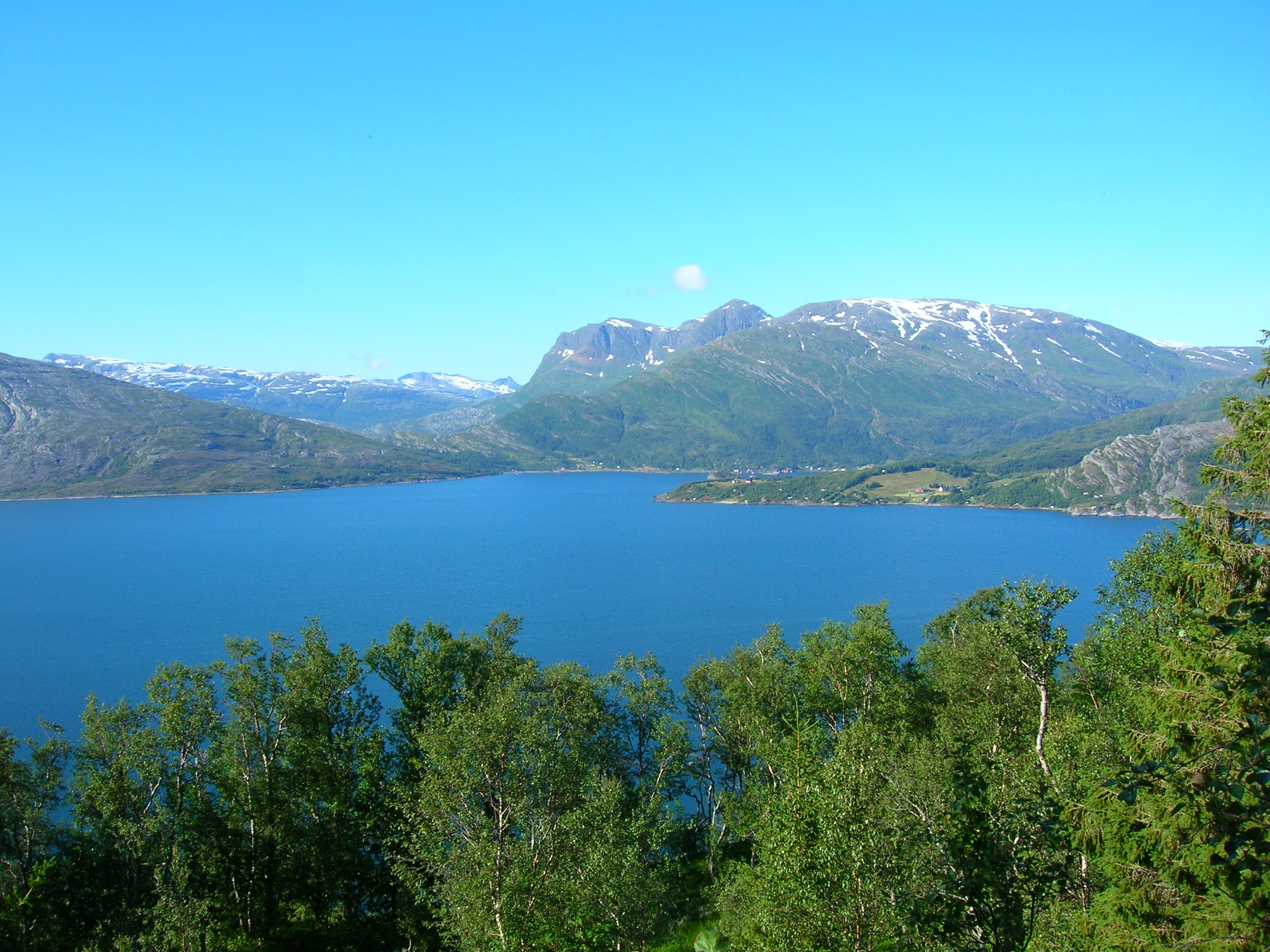
Inner part seen from the south
