= Saltfjellet–Svartisen National Park =

National park in Nordland, Norway

- IUCN category II (national park)

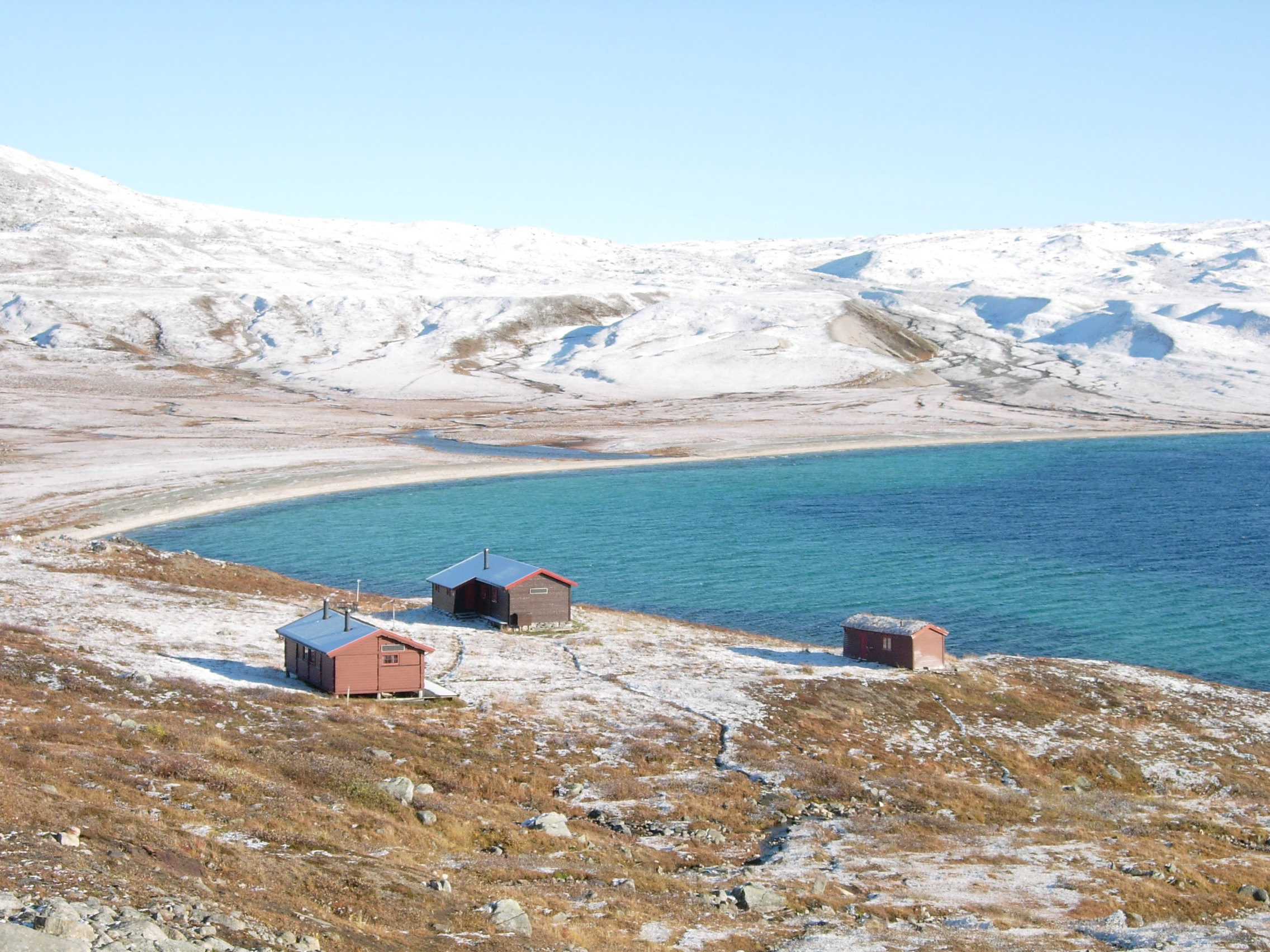
- There are cabins and hiking routes in the park; Bjellåvasstua in the northeastern part near Bjellåvatnet
- Interactive map of Saltfjellet–Svartisen National Park
- Location: Nordland, Norway
- Nearest city: Mo i Rana and Bodø
- Coordinates: 66°36′N 14°11′E
- Area: 2,192 km^{2} (846 sq mi)
- Established: 1989
- Governing body: Directorate for Nature Management

Saltfjellet–Svartisen National Park (Norwegian: Saltfjellet–Svartisen nasjonalpark) is a national park in Nordland county in Norway. It is located within the municipalities of Beiarn, Meløy, Rana, Rødøy, Saltdal, and Bodø. The park forms the centrepiece of a larger protected area of about 2,839 square kilometres (1,096 sq mi), which includes the adjacent Gåsvatnan and Saltfjellet landscape protection areas and four small nature reserves. Saltfjellet–Svartisen features diverse landscapes ranging from coastal regions to alpine plateaux, birch-covered valleys, and tundra, with Svartisen—Scandinavia's second-largest glacier at roughly 370 square kilometres (140 sq mi) occupying the southwestern corner. The park's calcareous bedrock supports a remarkably rich flora, while traditional Sámi reindeer husbandry continues within its boundaries. The European route E6 highway and the Nordland Line railway both follow the southern and eastern borders around the park.

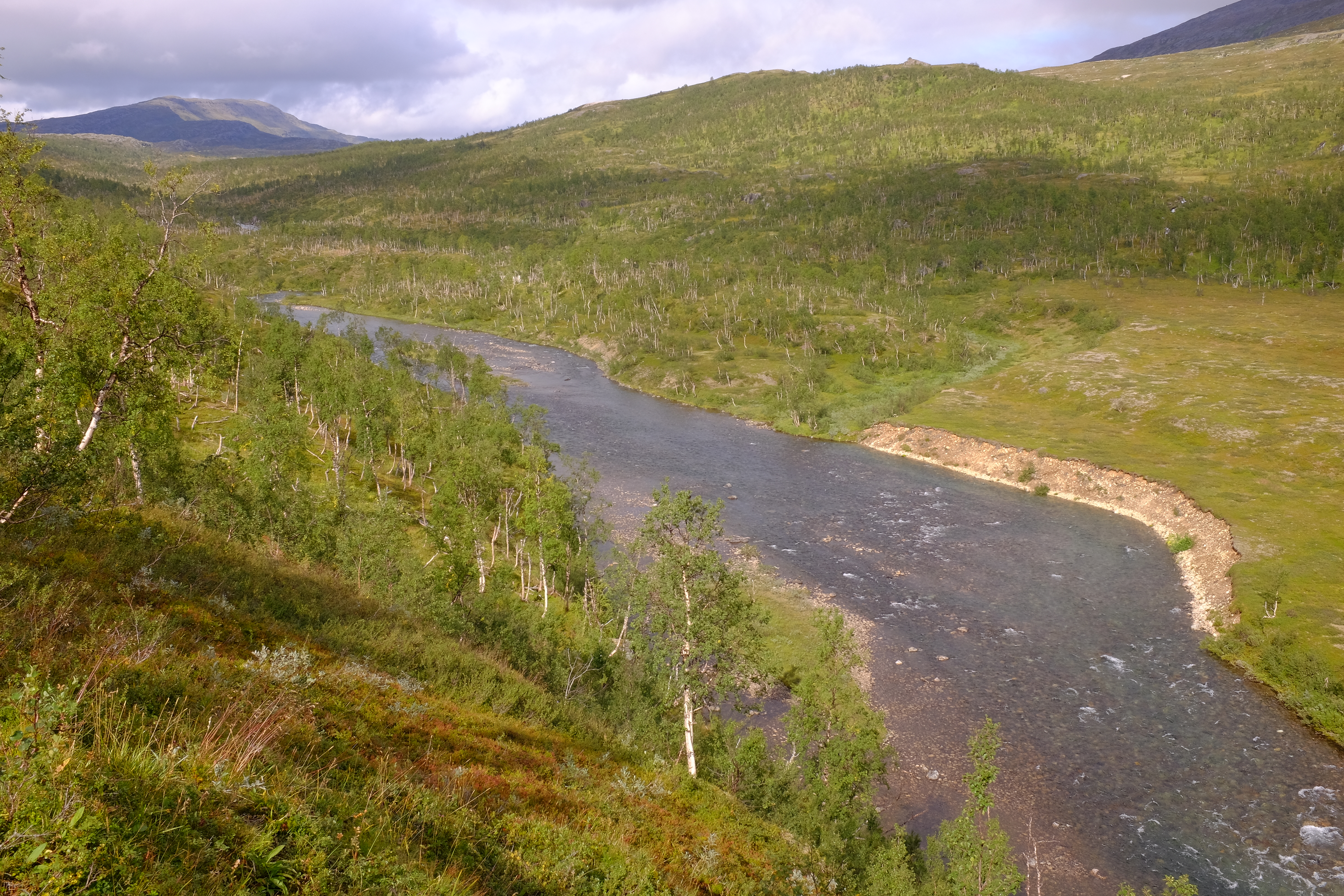
Bjøllåga river in Bjøllå valley, Saltfjellet-Svartisen National Park

== Geography and ecology ==
Saltfjellet–Svartisen was designated a national park by royal decree in 1989 and covers 2102 km^{2}; together with the adjacent Gåsvatnan and Saltfjellet landscape protection areas and four small nature reserves, it forms a contiguous protected area of about 2839 km^{2}.The park spans a pronounced west–east gradient, from the Nordfjorden coast through high alpine plateaux to birch‑covered valleys and open tundra. Svartisen, Scandinavia's second‑largest glacier at roughly 370 square kilometres (140 sq mi), occupies the park's southwestern corner and feeds a network of meltwater rivers and lakes. Underlain by extensive calcareous (calcium carbonate-rich) bedrock, Saltfjellet supports a particularly diverse flora, including several regionally rare species. Traditional Sami reindeer husbandry remains integral: the Saltfjellet and Hestmannen/Strandtindene grazing districts maintain rights within the park (4783 animals in 2014), and three Swedish Sami "samebyer" graze seasonally in July and August.

== Visitor use ==
A 2017 visitor survey by the Norwegian Institute for Nature Research recorded 1607 respondents (average age 44 years; 53 percent women), of whom 67 percent were Norwegian nationals (48 percent locally resident), 57 percent had visited before and 74 percent were on day trips when surveyed. These insights are guiding the park authority's ongoing visitor‑management strategy.

A 2015 PPGIS (Public Participation Geographic Information System) study of 486 park users mapped over 10000 place‑based values and preferences within Saltfjellet–Svartisen National Park. Saltfjellet–Svartisen stood out for its strong emphasis on traditional resource‑use values—hunting, fishing, gathering and Sami cultural identity were all significantly over‑represented compared with other Norwegian parks. Participants also showed clear support for increased predator control and motorized access (snowmobiles, helicopters), while opposing industrial and energy development within park boundaries.
