= Nord-Rana Municipality =

Former municipality in Nordland, Norway

Nord-Rana Municipality Nord-Rana herred
- Former municipality
- Mo herred (historic name); Nord-Ranen herred (historic name)
- Nordland within Norway

- Nord-Rana within Nordland
- Coordinates: 66°20′46″N 14°07′48″E
- Country: Norway
- County: Nordland
- District: Helgeland
- Established: 1839
  - Preceded by: Ranen Municipality
- Disestablished: 1 Jan 1964
  - Succeeded by: Rana Municipality
- Administrative centre: Ytteren

Government
  - Mayor (1963-1964): Per Karstensen (Ap)

Area (upon dissolution)
  - Total: 3,980.80 km^{2} (1,537.00 sq mi)
  - Rank: #4 in Norway
- Highest elevation: 1,589.26 m (5,214.1 ft)

Population (1963)
  - Total: 10,648
  - Rank: #64 in Norway
  - Density: 2.7/km^{2} (7.0/sq mi)
  - Change (10 years): ▲ +42.3%
- Demonym(s): Moværing; Ranværing

Official language
  - Norwegian form: Neutral
- Time zone: UTC+01:00 (CET)
  - Summer (DST): UTC+02:00 (CEST)
- ISO 3166 code: NO-1833

Nord-Rana (historically: Mo) is a former municipality in Nordland county, Norway. The 3,980-square-kilometre (1,540 sq mi) municipality existed from 1839 until its dissolution in 1964. From 1839 until 1844, it was named Nord-Ranen Municipality, from 1844 until 1923, it was called Mo Municipality, and then from 1923 until 1964 it was named Nord-Rana Municipality. The former municipality was located at the innermost part of the Ranfjorden. It encompassed the eastern 90% of what is now Rana Municipality. The administrative centre was the village of Ytteren, just north of the town of Mo i Rana.

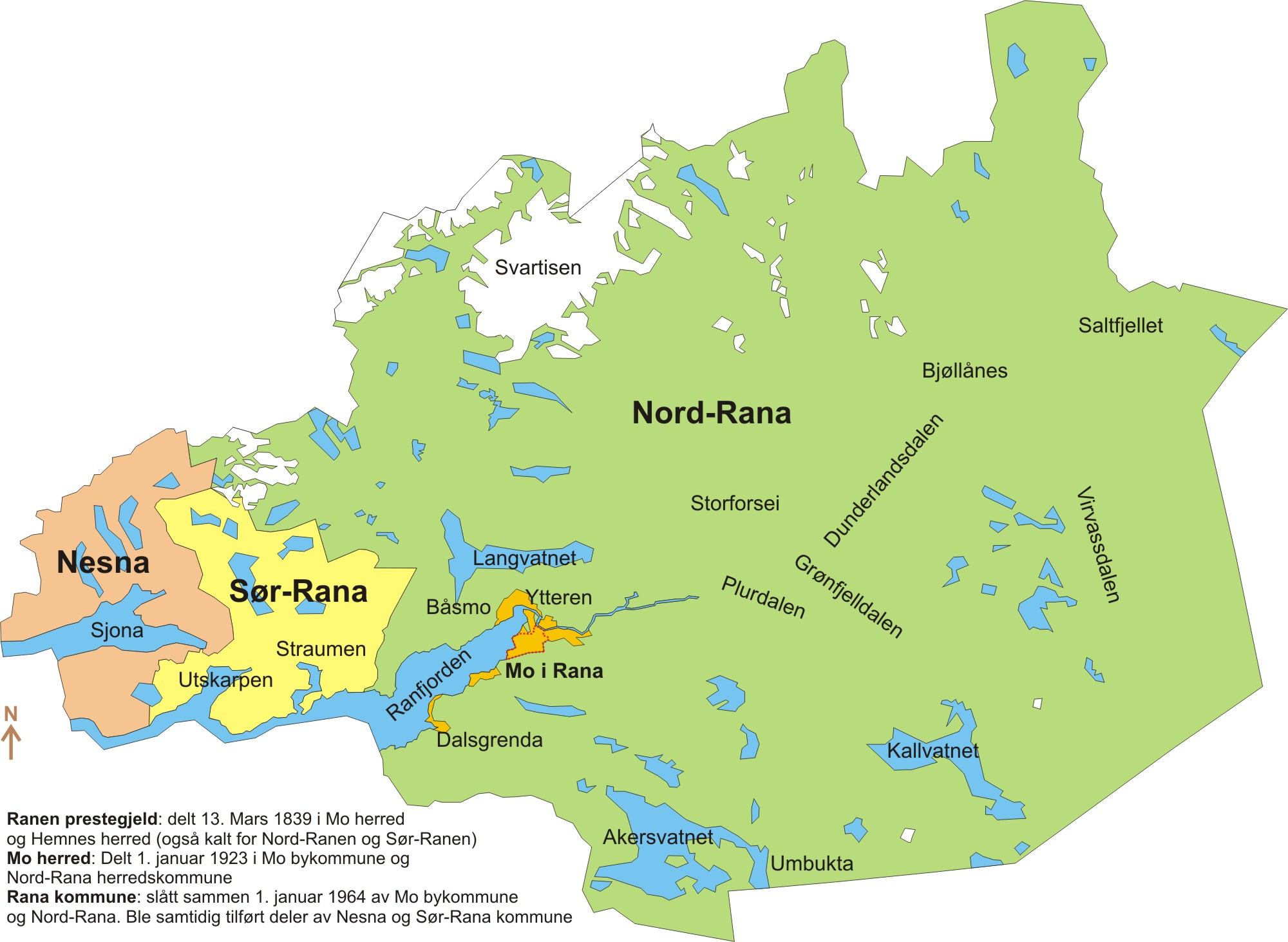
Map of the areas in Rana Municipality that were merged in 1964.

Prior to its dissolution in 1964, the 3,980.8-square-kilometre (1,537.0 sq mi) municipality was the 4th largest by area out of the 689 municipalities in Norway. Nord-Rana Municipality was the 64th most populous municipality in Norway with a population of about 10,648. The municipality's population density was 2.7 inhabitants per square kilometre (7.0/sq mi) and its population had increased by 42.3% over the previous 10-year period.

== General information ==
Rana Municipality was established on 1 January 1838 under the old formannskapsdistrikt law. Shortly afterwards, in 1839, the municipality was divided into Nord-Ranen Municipality and Sør-Ranen Municipality. In 1844, Nord-Ranen Municipality was renamed Mo Municipality. On 1 January 1923, the village of Mo was designated as a ladested and so it was separated from the rest of the municipality to become a town-municipality of its own. The new town of Mo (population: 1,305) kept the name Mo and the rest of the old municipality became known as Nord-Rana Municipality (bringing back the old name for the area).

During the 1960s, there were many municipal mergers across Norway due to the work of the Schei Committee. On 1 January 1964, Nord-Rana Municipality (population: 11,636) was merged with the town of Mo i Rana (population: 9,616), the part of Sør-Rana Municipality located north of the Ranfjorden (population: 697), and the Sjona area of Nesna Municipality (population: 543) to create the large, new Rana Municipality.

=== Name ===
The municipality is named Nord-Rana. The first element is nord which directly translates to "northern". The second element is Rana which comes from the local river Ranelva (Old Norse: Raðund). The name of the river is probably derived from the word raðr which means "quick", "fast", or "rapid". Another possibility is that the name comes from the old Sami god Rana Niejta.

== Geography ==
The highest point in the municipality was the 1,589.26-metre (5,214.1 ft) tall mountain Snøtinden. The former municipality was located at the innermost part of the Ranfjorden. Saltdal Municipality, Beiarn Municipality, and Meløy Municipality were located to the north; Rødøy Municipality and Nesna Municipality were located to the west; Sør-Rana Municipality was located to the southwest; and the nation of Sweden was located to the east. The self-governing town of Mo was located within Nord-Rana Municipality as an enclave.

== Government ==
While it existed, Nord-Rana Municipality was responsible for primary education (through 10th grade), outpatient health services, senior citizen services, welfare and other social services, zoning, economic development, and municipal roads and utilities. The municipality was governed by a municipal council of directly elected representatives. The mayor was indirectly elected by a vote of the municipal council. Hålogaland Court of Appeal.

=== Municipal council ===
The municipal council (Herredsstyre) of Nord-Rana was made up of 35 representatives that were elected to four year terms. The tables below show the historical composition of the council by political party.

Nord-Rana herredsstyre 1959–1963
Party name (in Norwegian)	Number of representatives
Labour Party (Arbeiderpartiet)	24
Conservative Party (Høyre)	2
Communist Party (Kommunistiske Parti)	4
Christian Democratic Party (Kristelig Folkeparti)	2
Centre Party (Senterpartiet)	3
Total number of members:	35
Note: On 1 January 1964, Nord-Rana Municipality became part of Rana Municipality.

Nord-Rana herredsstyre 1955–1959
Party name (in Norwegian)	Number of representatives
Labour Party (Arbeiderpartiet)	22
Communist Party (Kommunistiske Parti)	6
Joint List(s) of Non-Socialist Parties (Borgerlige Felleslister)	7
Total number of members:	35

Nord-Rana herredsstyre 1951–1955
Party name (in Norwegian)	Number of representatives
Labour Party (Arbeiderpartiet)	14
Communist Party (Kommunistiske Parti)	5
Joint List(s) of Non-Socialist Parties (Borgerlige Felleslister)	5
Total number of members:	24

Nord-Rana herredsstyre 1947–1951
Party name (in Norwegian)	Number of representatives
Labour Party (Arbeiderpartiet)	12
Communist Party (Kommunistiske Parti)	7
Joint List(s) of Non-Socialist Parties (Borgerlige Felleslister)	5
Total number of members:	24

Nord-Rana herredsstyre 1945–1947
Party name (in Norwegian)	Number of representatives
Labour Party (Arbeiderpartiet)	15
Communist Party (Kommunistiske Parti)	6
Local List(s) (Lokale lister)	3
Total number of members:	24

Nord-Rana herredsstyre 1937–1941*
Party name (in Norwegian)	Number of representatives
Labour Party (Arbeiderpartiet)	17
Farmers' Party (Bondepartiet)	5
Liberal Party (Venstre)	1
Local List(s) (Lokale lister)	1
Total number of members:	24
Note: Due to the German occupation of Norway during World War II, no elections were held for new municipal councils until after the war ended in 1945.

=== Mayors ===
The mayor (Norwegian: ordfører) of Nord-Rana Municipality was the political leader of the municipality and the chairperson of the municipal council. Here is a list of people who held this position:

- 1838–1842: Hans Wølner
- 1842–1844: Johannes Hansen
- 1844–1847: Holger Olsen Enge
- 1848–1851: Agathon Bartholomæus Hansteen
- 1852–1854: Johannes Hansen
- 1854–1856: Jens Jensen Yttermark
- 1857–1860: Jakob Jæger
- 1860–1864: Jens Jensen Yttermark
- 1865–1866: Peder Johanessen
- 1867–1874: Jens Pedersen Ånes
- 1874–1877: Jens Jensen Yttermark
- 1877–1883: Jonas Frost Enga
- 1883–1888: Anders Bang Hanssen Leirbakhei
- 1889–1894: Hans P. Johnsen
- 1895–1901: Jakob Thode Jakobsen
- 1902–1907: Einar Nilsen
- 1908–1910: Ragnvald Hvoslef
- 1911–1913: Peder Pedersen
- 1914–1916: Johannes Skaar
- 1917–1922: Redvald Knudtson
- 1923–1924: Peder Pedersen Ytteren (Bp)
- 1925–1939: Åsmund Olsen Selfors (NKP)
- 1940–1940: Einar Aanes (Ap)
- 1945–1950: Einar Aanes (Ap)
- 1950–1963: Eilif M. Davidsen (Ap)
- 1963–1964: Per Karstensen (Ap)

== See also ==
- List of former municipalities of Norway
