= Bolna =

Bolna may refer to:

== Places ==
- Bolna, Rana, a mountain in the municipality of Rana, Norway
- Bolna Station, a station on the Nordland Line in Rana, Norway

== Music ==
- "Bolna" (song), a duet by Arijit Singh and Asees Kaur, composed by Tanishk Bagchi for the 2016 Indian film Kapoor & Sons
- Waqt Par Bolna, an album by Hariharan
