= Dunderland Valley =

Valley in Rana, Norway

- Dunderlandsdalen (Norwegian); Dunndaravuobme (Lule Sami)
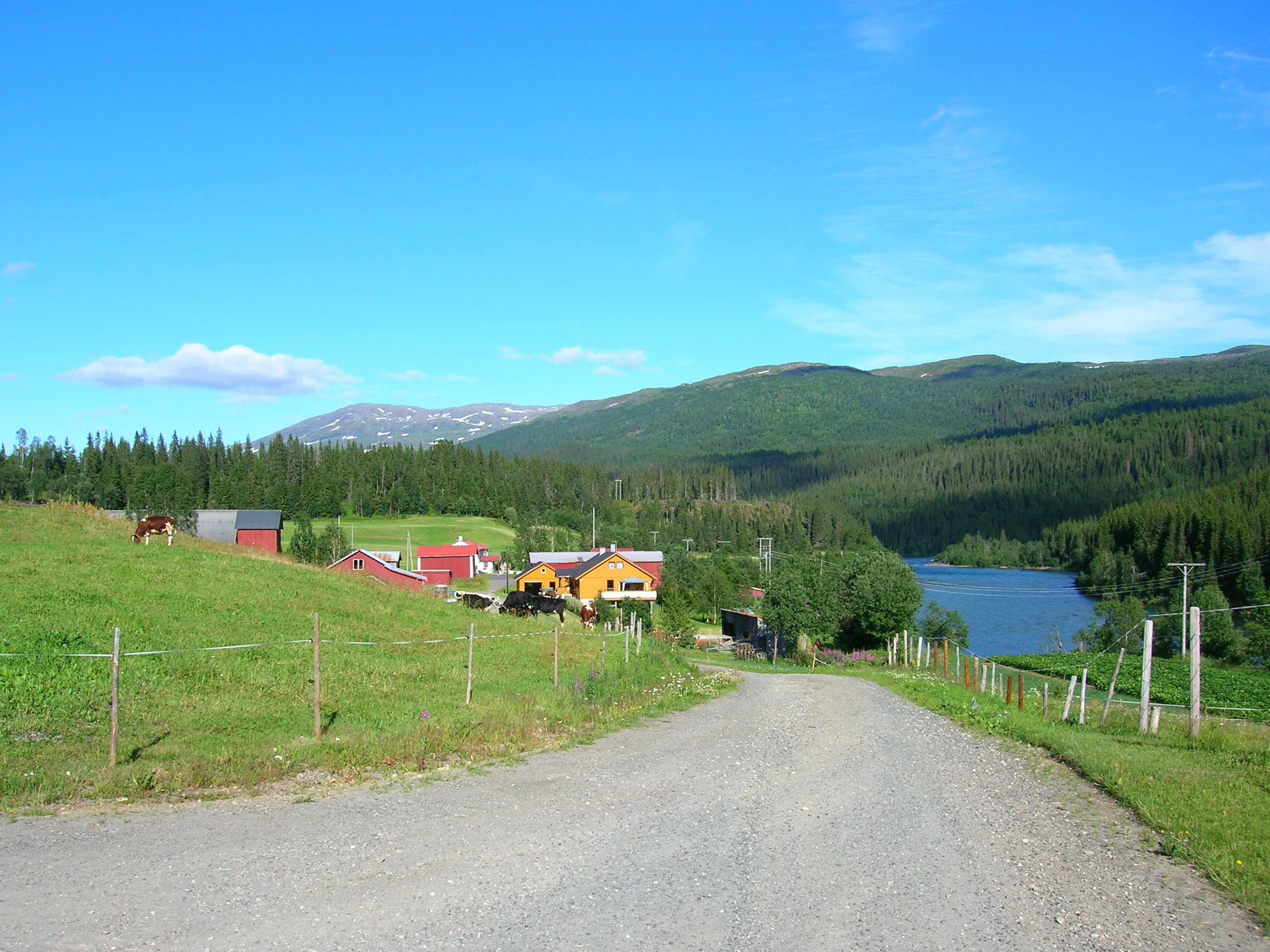
- View of the valley at Eiterå
- Length: 80 kilometres (50 mi)

Geology
- Type: River valley

Geography
- Location: Nordland, Norway
- Coordinates: 66°23′01″N 14°34′04″E

Location
- Interactive map of the valley

The Dunderland Valley (Norwegian: Dunderlandsdalen, Lule Sami: Dunndaravuobme) is a valley in Rana Municipality in Nordland county, Norway. It reaches from just below the eastern Saltfjellet plateau about 8 miles (13 km) south of the Arctic Circle. The mountain Bolna is situated in the uppermost boundary of the valley which then proceeds to the southwest all the way down to the Ranfjorden. Some of the minor side valleys include Plurdalen, Røvassdalen, Bjøllådalen, Grønfjelldalen and Virvassdalen. The valley also includes several villages such as Krokstrand, Bjøllånes, Storvoll, Dunderland, Eiterå, Nevernes, Storforshei, Nevermoen and Røssvoll.

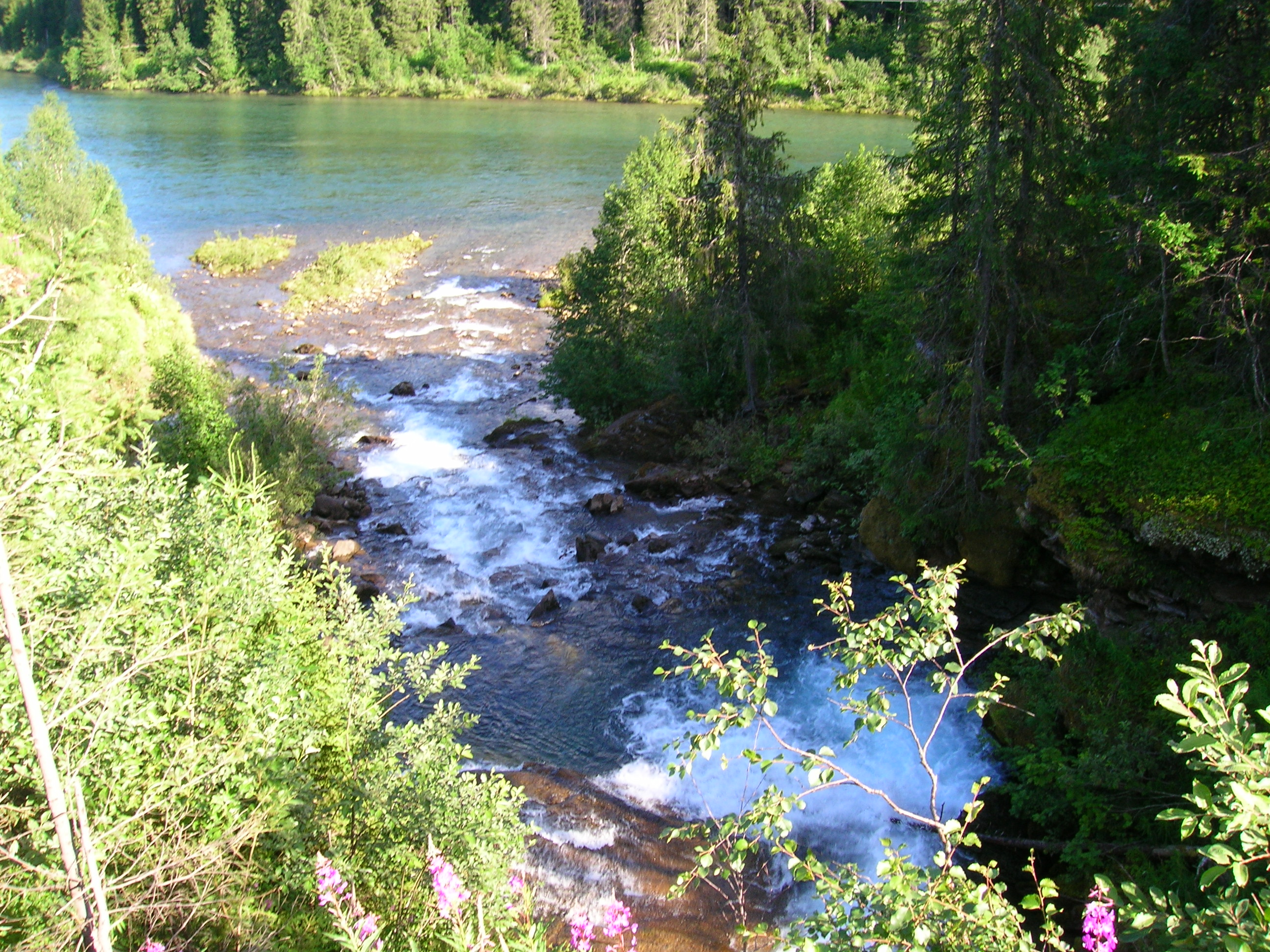
Eiterå river, Dunderland Valley. July 2007

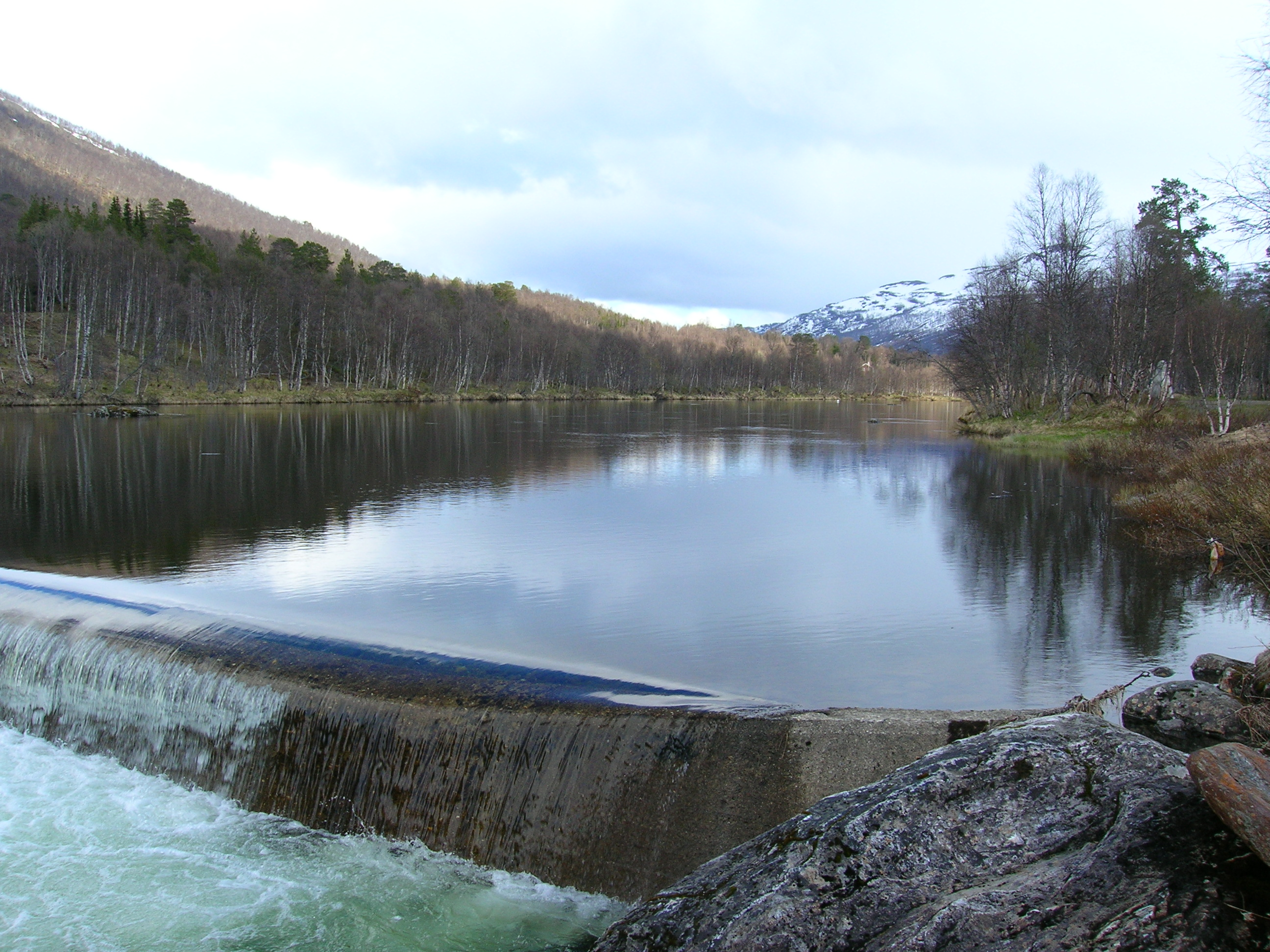
Ranelva river at Storvoll in Dunderland Valley; May 2007

The European route E6 highway passes through the Dunderland Valley, following the Ranelva river. The Illhøllia Tunnel on the E6 highway, between Nevermoen and Røssvoll, was opened in 2002. The Nordland Line also follows the river through the valley. Today, the valley only houses a small number of people, and it has two stations on the Nordland Line: Dunderland Station and Bolna Station.

== Geology ==
The mountain rocks in the Dunderland Valley are a caledonian shale, known from its occurrences of iron ore, mica schist, and marble. Its mining industry has produced Fauske marble, also present in Fauske Municipality to the north. At Storforshei, there has been a large-scale iron mining industry.

There are also pyrite mines. The valley has several stalactite caverns in the limestone, with some of the tributary streams flowing for considerable distances underground. From the upper parts of the Dunderland Valley, a sequestered bridle-path runs from Bolna to Saltdal Municipality on the Skjerstadfjord, with a branch through the magnificent Junkerdal National Park.

=== Mining ===
Deposits of iron ore have been known in this area since 1799. The Dunderland Iron Ore Company mined here during several operative periods, the first one starting in 1902. The river Ranelva provided water power to the miners. The mining company was closed in 1947.

Since 1937, Rana Gruber has mined iron ore. Norsk Jernverk was established in 1946, and it began mining magnetite and hematite from the iron ore in 1964.

== History ==
=== Recent history ===
This valley was the site to several accidents and recorded events in Norwegian history. During the World War II, Nazis had several concentration camps in the valley. They mainly housed Polish and Russian prisoners, who were used to build the Nordland Line from Trondheim. The stretch of railway passing through Saltfjellet was extremely brutal and many lost their lives building this. The German troops disposed the bodies the majority of the sick/diseased prisoners in the river Ranelva which flows through the Dunderland Valley. The strong currents made it almost impossible to recover anyone.

In 1948, the Dunderlandsdal accident occurred, it was one of the worst bus accidents in Norwegian history to date. For the Sámi, the valley has a special symbolic value due to a tragic incident that occurred about one hundred years ago. In the early 1900s a bus returning from a Sámi conference in Tromsø drove off the road and crashed into the Ranelva river at the bottom of the valley. Of the 23 people on board, 16 were killed and 4 were never found. Most of the people aboard the bus died, and thus the Southern Sámi people lost most of their political leaders in one single blow. There is a memorial that was built on the site in 1950 where the bus ran off the road. It is somewhat hidden in the forest, but accessible from the road by a small stairway.

In 1953, a family tragedy struck the valley. A family was found slaughtered at a remote farm. A young girl at the age of 6 and her mother were found killed in the barn. The father was found hung in the same barn.

In 1995, another tragic event hit the valley. During a Boy Scout camp at an old farm, a 12-year-old girl disappeared. The girl was from the town of Tromsø in Northern Norway. The event was widely covered in Norwegian press. Crews searched for her for two years, but all they found was her backpack lying alongside the Ranelva river.

=== Stone Age settlements ===
There have been settlements in the Dunderland Valley since the Stone Age. In the summer of 2003, a Danish tourist discovered a battle axe (Streitaxe) close to the river Eiterå. The axe was delivered to the Cultural Department of the Rana Museum on 1 July 2004.

This is the first discovery of the battle axe culture in the inner parts of Northern Norway. In 1913, a 20-centimetre (7.9 in) long axe from the same cultural horizon was discovered on Brattland in Utskarpen. The axe is a "boat-axe" of Swedish-Norwegian type from about 2800—2400 BC. It was not a functional tool, but rather a dignity symbol of worthiness and a high social class. It may have belonged to a local chieftain.

The stripe on the backside of the axe resembles an edge from moulding, and is an imitation of moulded axes in bronze from Skåne or Denmark. According to the geologist Barbara Prisemann (Department of Natural history, Rana museum), the axe is made from the green shale rock type.

==== Axe pictures ====
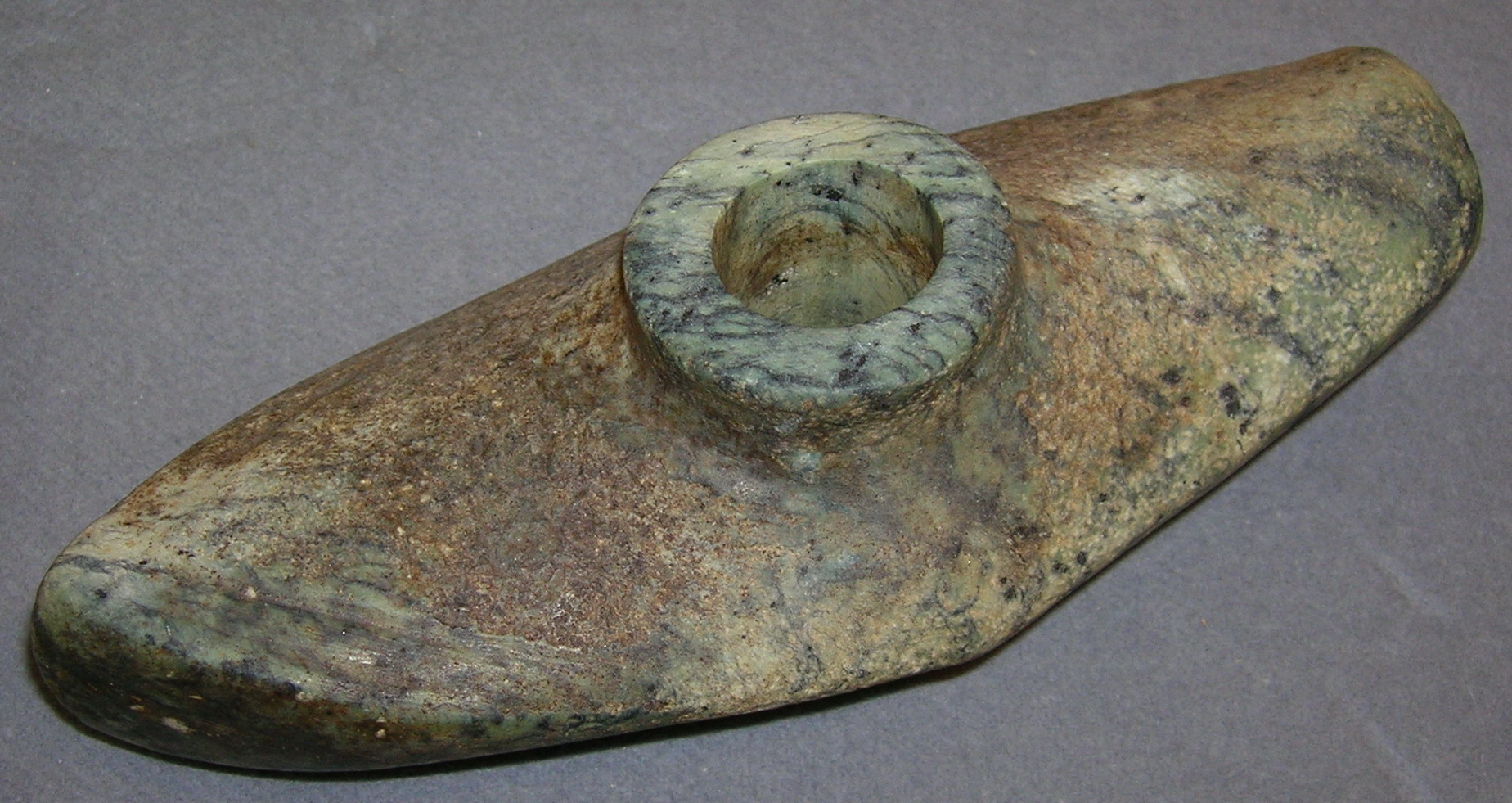

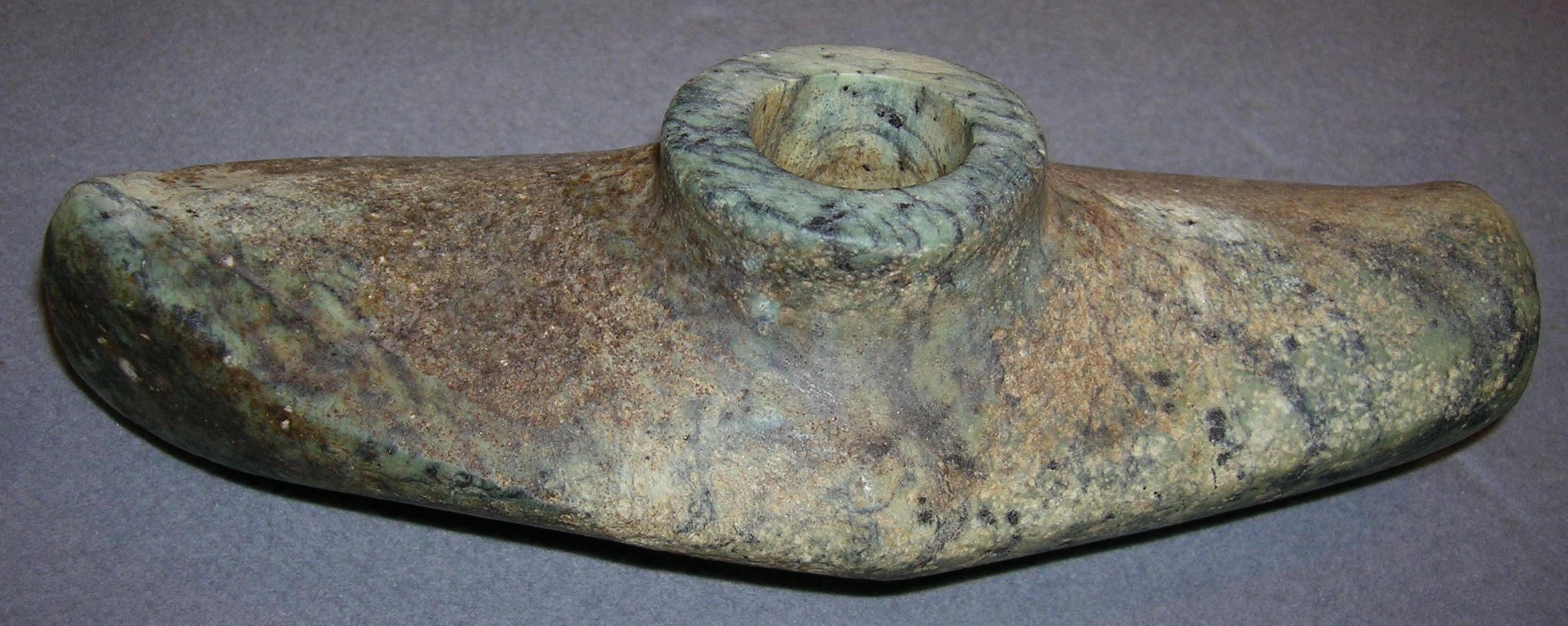

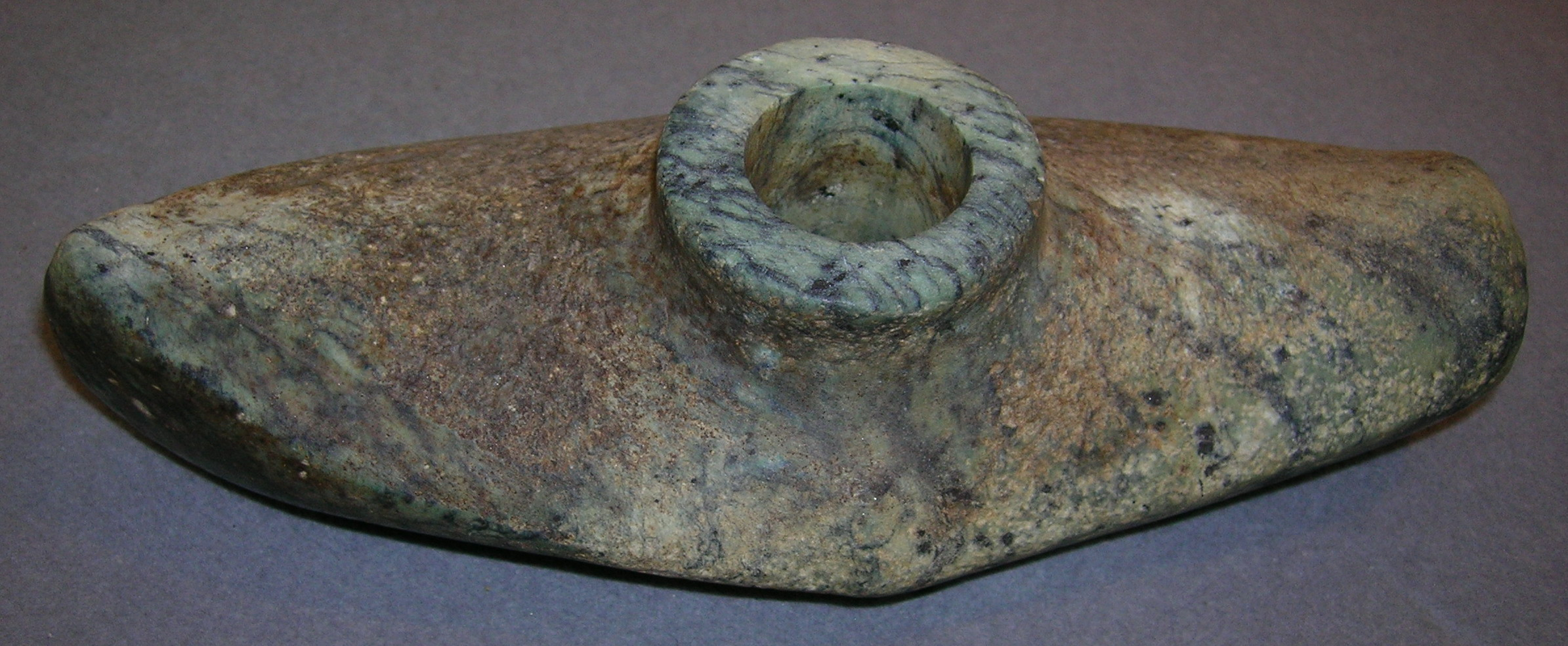

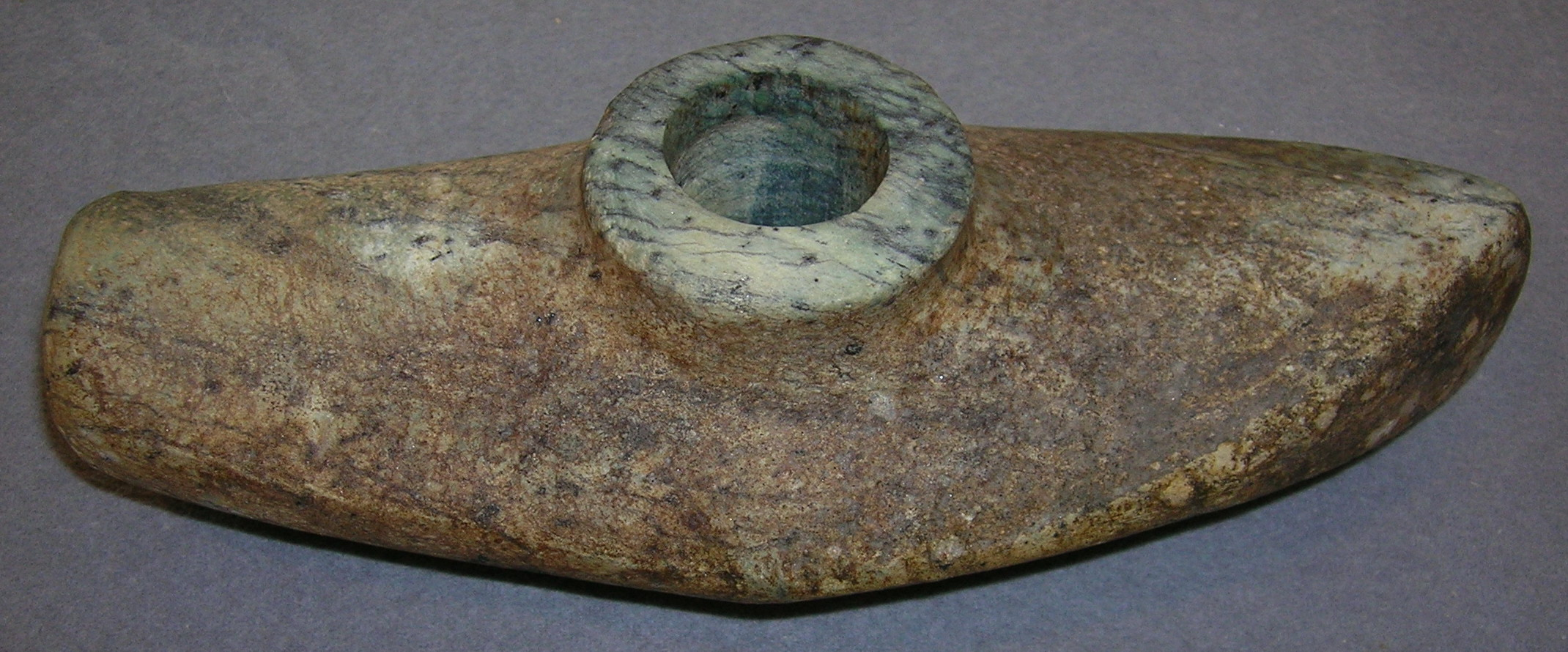

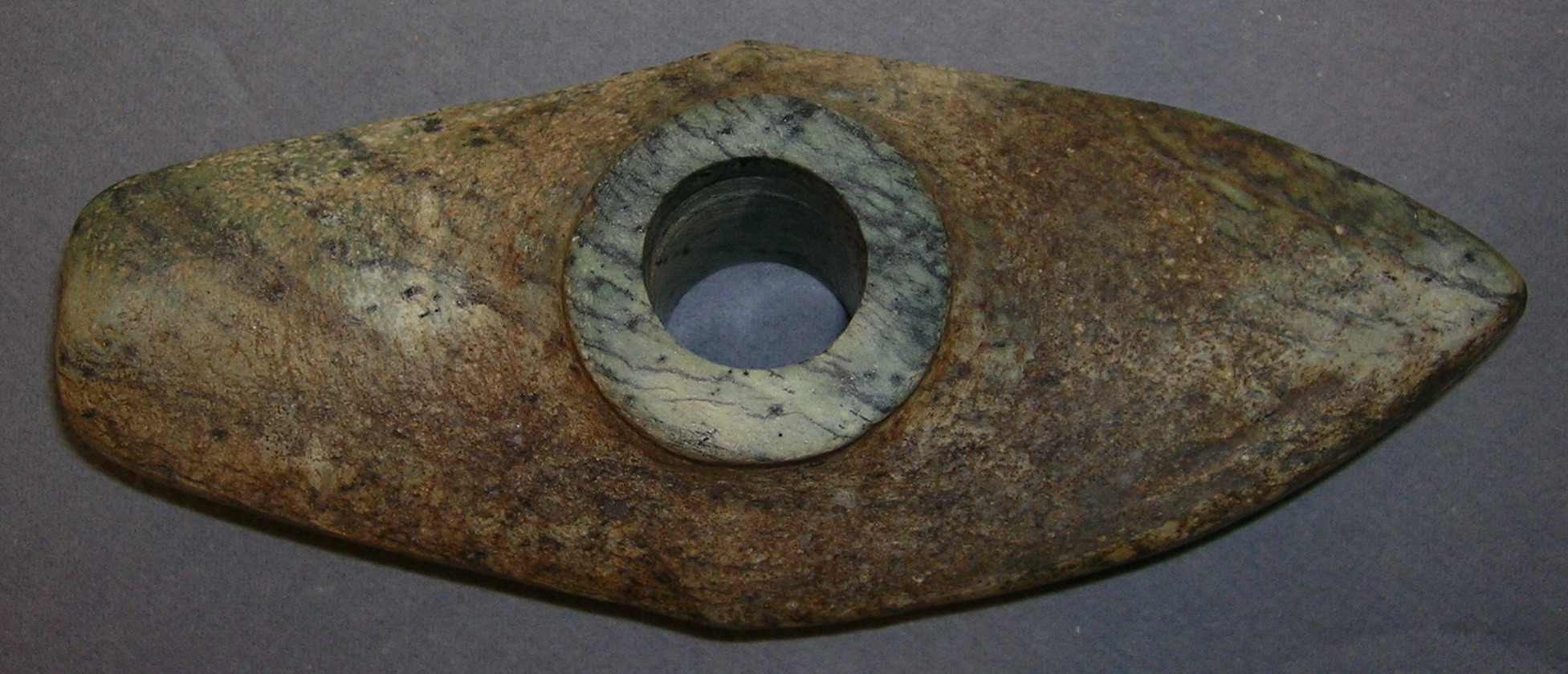
right from above

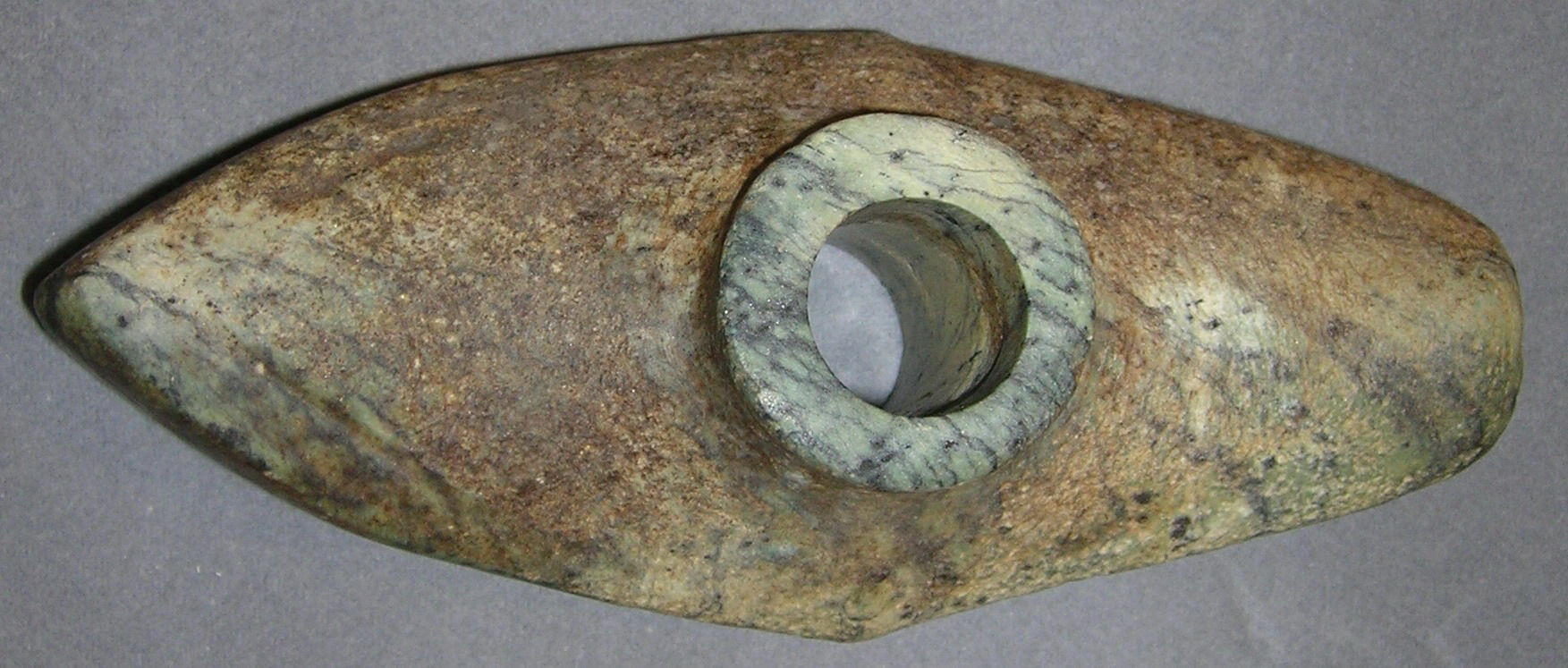
left from above

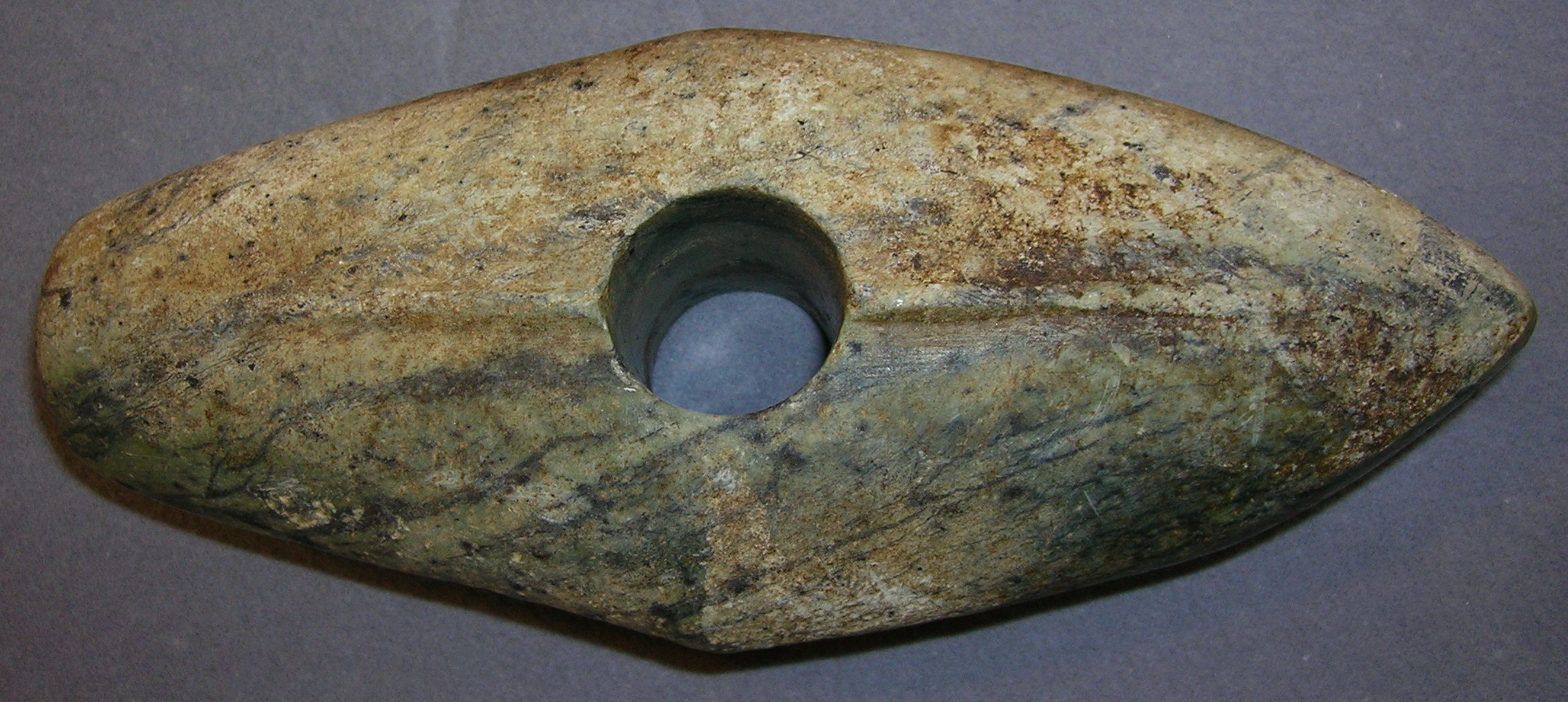
right from the back

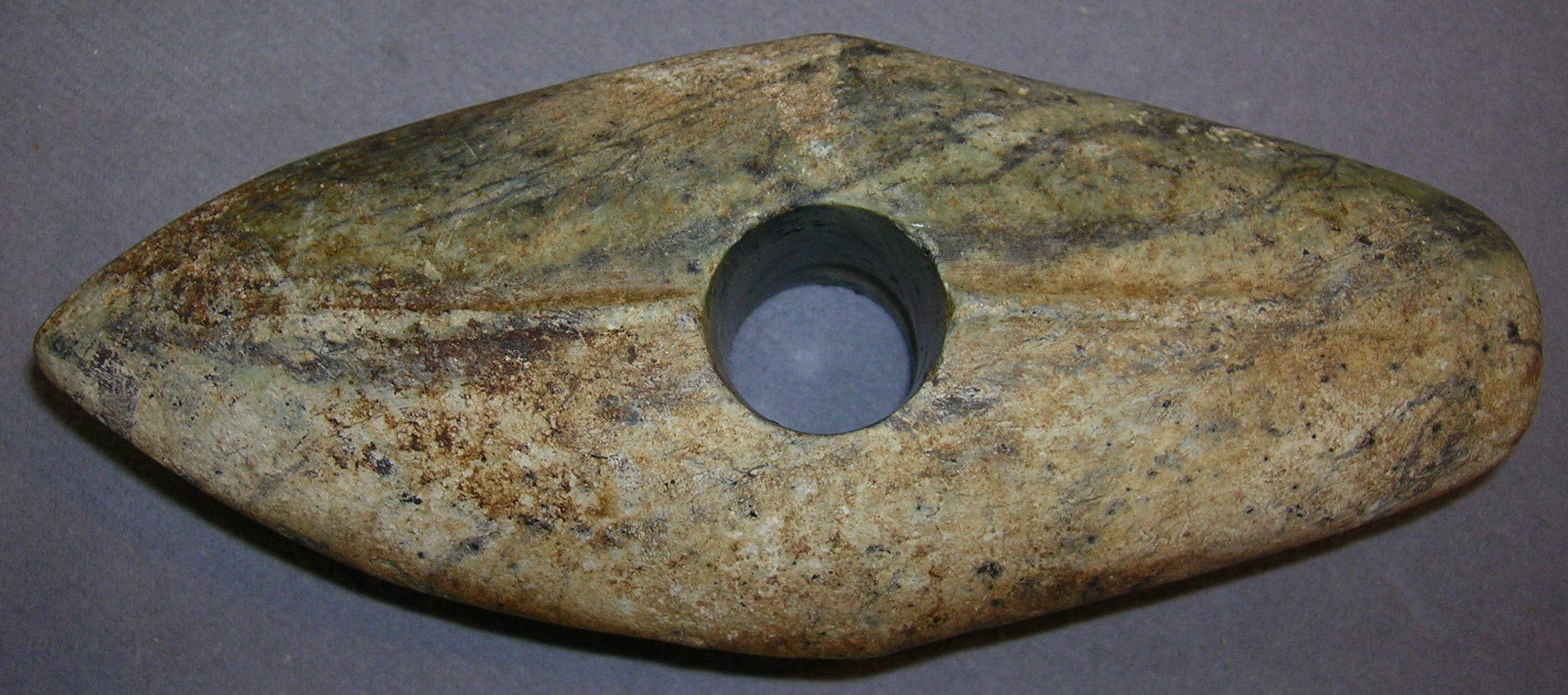
left from the back
