= Eiteråga =

Village in Rana Municipality, Norway

- Village
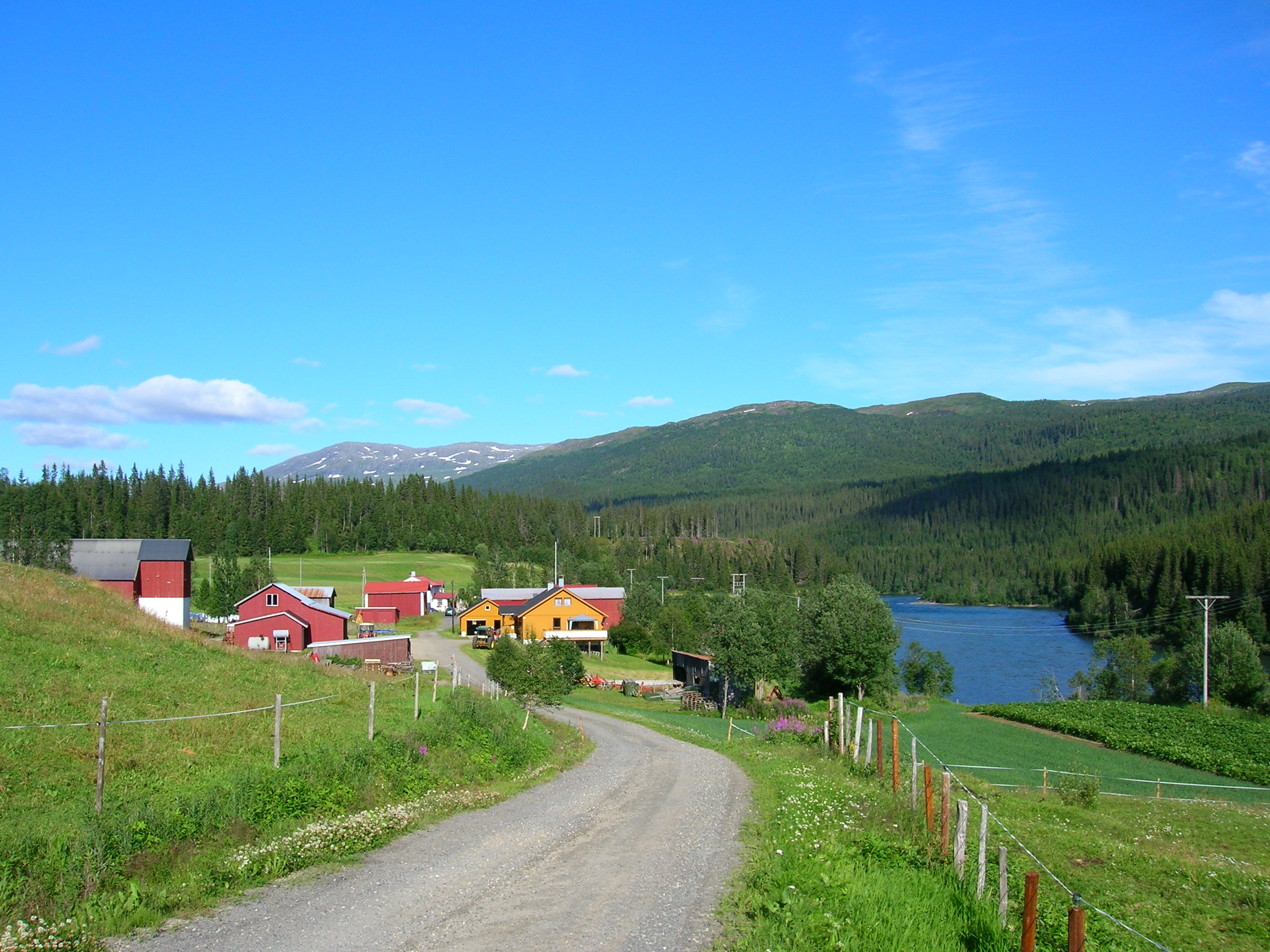
- View of one of the farms
- Interactive map of Eiteråga
- Location within Nordland Location within Norway
- Coordinates: 66.3968°N 14.6678°E
- Country: Norway
- Region: Northern Norway
- County: Nordland
- District: Helgeland
- Municipality: Rana Municipality
- Elevation: 94 m (308 ft)
- Time zone: UTC+01:00 (CET)
  - Summer (DST): UTC+02:00 (CEST)
- Post Code: 8630 Storforshei

Eiteråga is a village in Rana Municipality in Nordland county, Norway. The village is located in the Dunderland Valley, along the Ranelva river about 7 kilometres (4.3 mi) east of the village of Storforsheia and about 10 kilometres (6.2 mi) south of the village of Dunderland. The European route E6 highway passes through the village. The Stjernen Art and Silver Gallery is a local shop that produces pieces of jewelry from silver and precious stones.

The primary industry for Eiteråga is mainly farming. The area was cleared for farming in 1723. Originally, the village was composed of two farms. Since 1749 the village has been centered on four farms, more or less equal in size. The farms were regulated by the Norwegian state in 1925.

== River ==
There is a small river that passes through the village that is also named Eiteråga. The river name may mean "the cold river" which comes from the Old Norse word: eitr. The name may also be derived from Proto-Germanic aitra-, meaning "something welling forwards". The river has its source in between the mountains Bomfjellet and Ørtfjellet.

== Media gallery ==
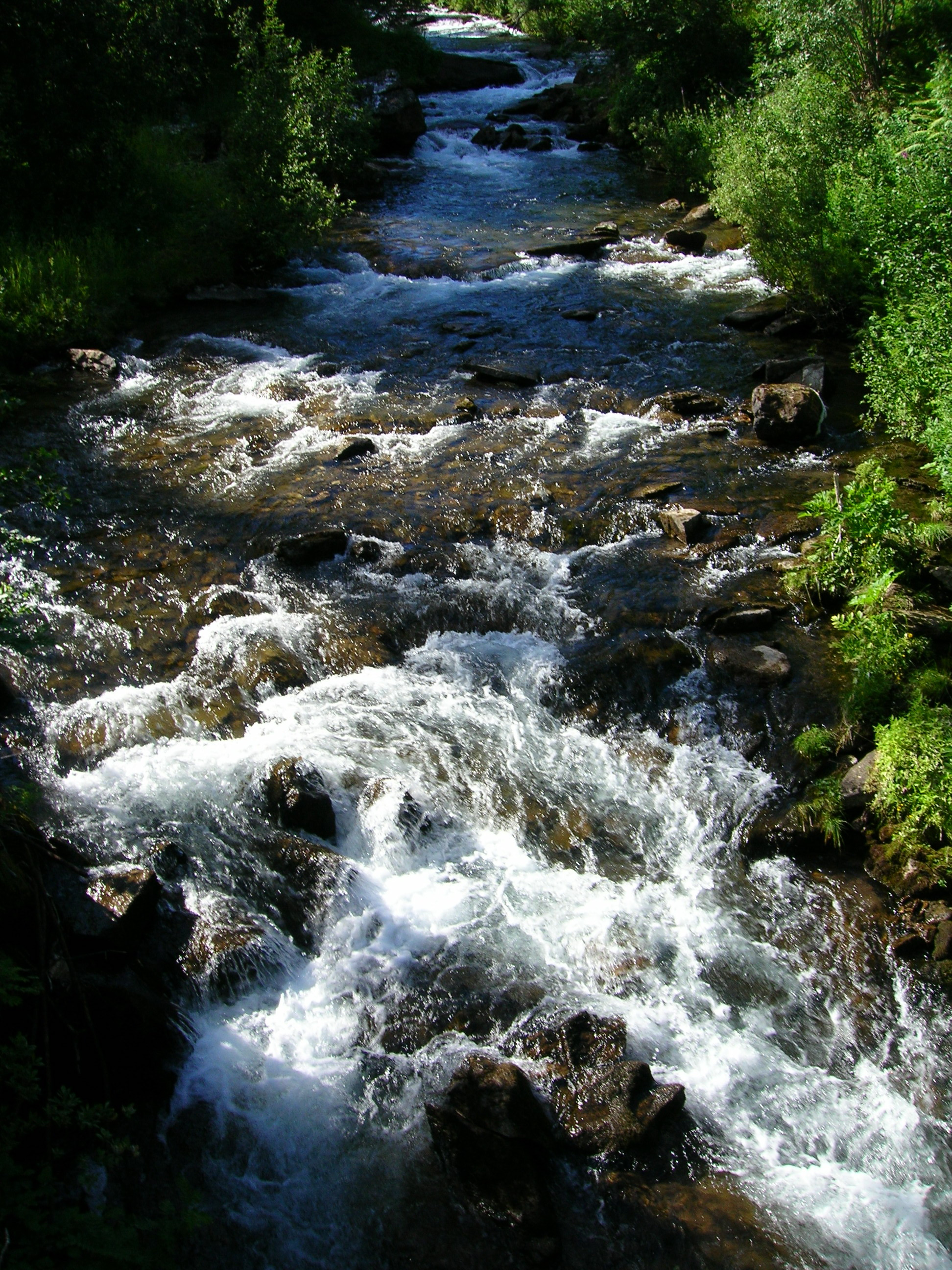
Eiteråa flowing down from the mountain

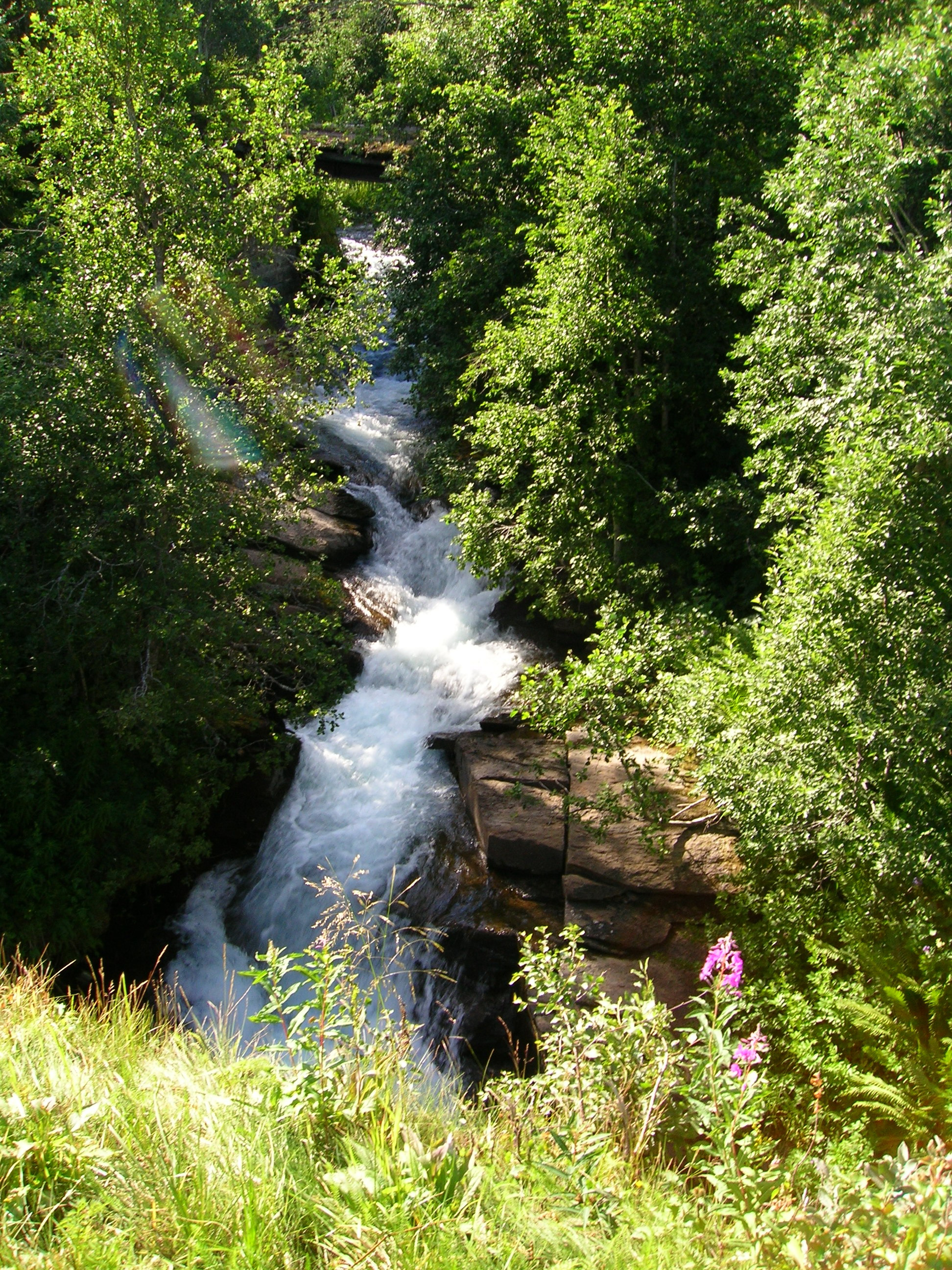
Eiteråa passing beneath a bridge at E6

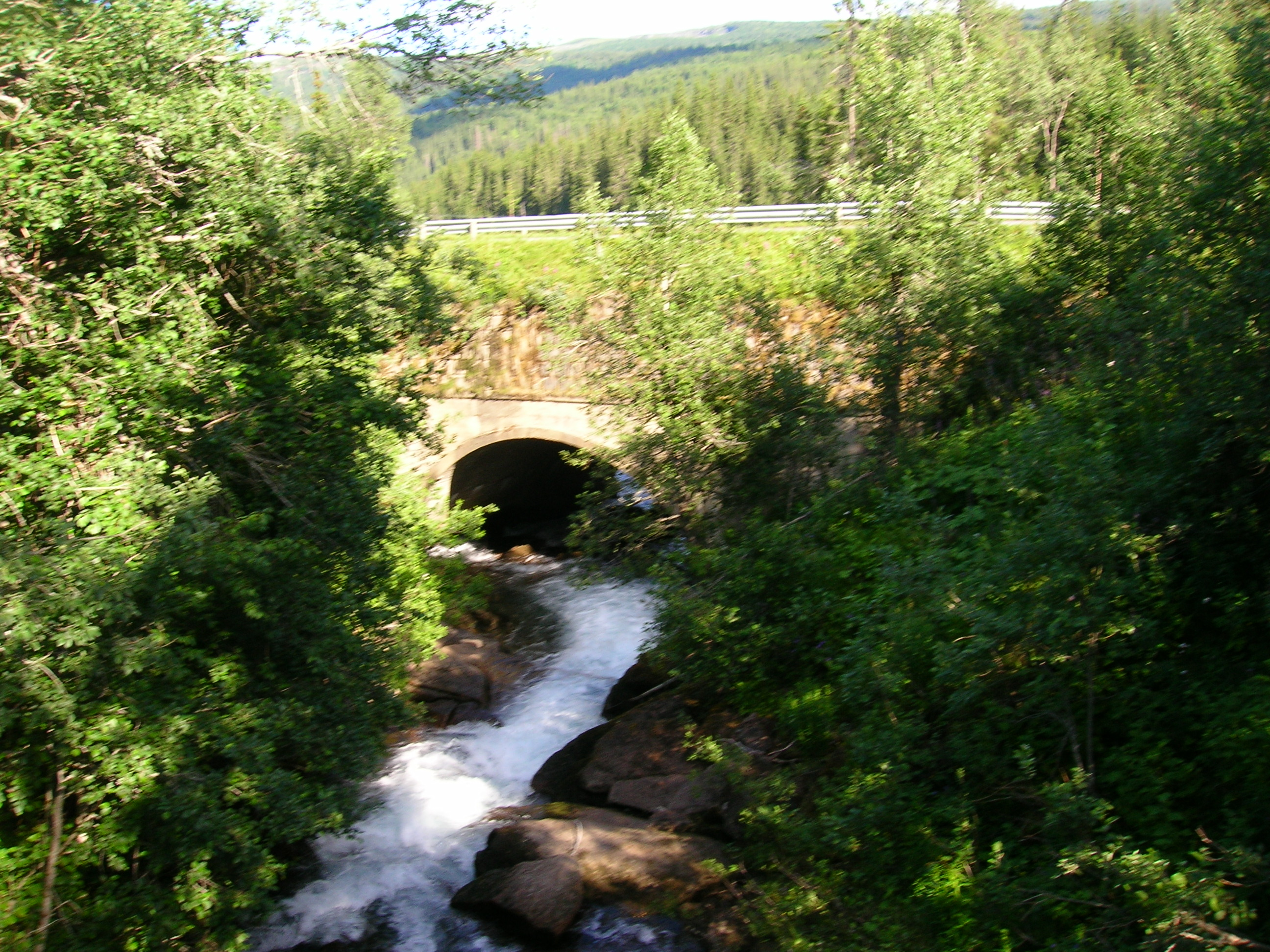
Eiteråa passing beneath a bridge at E6

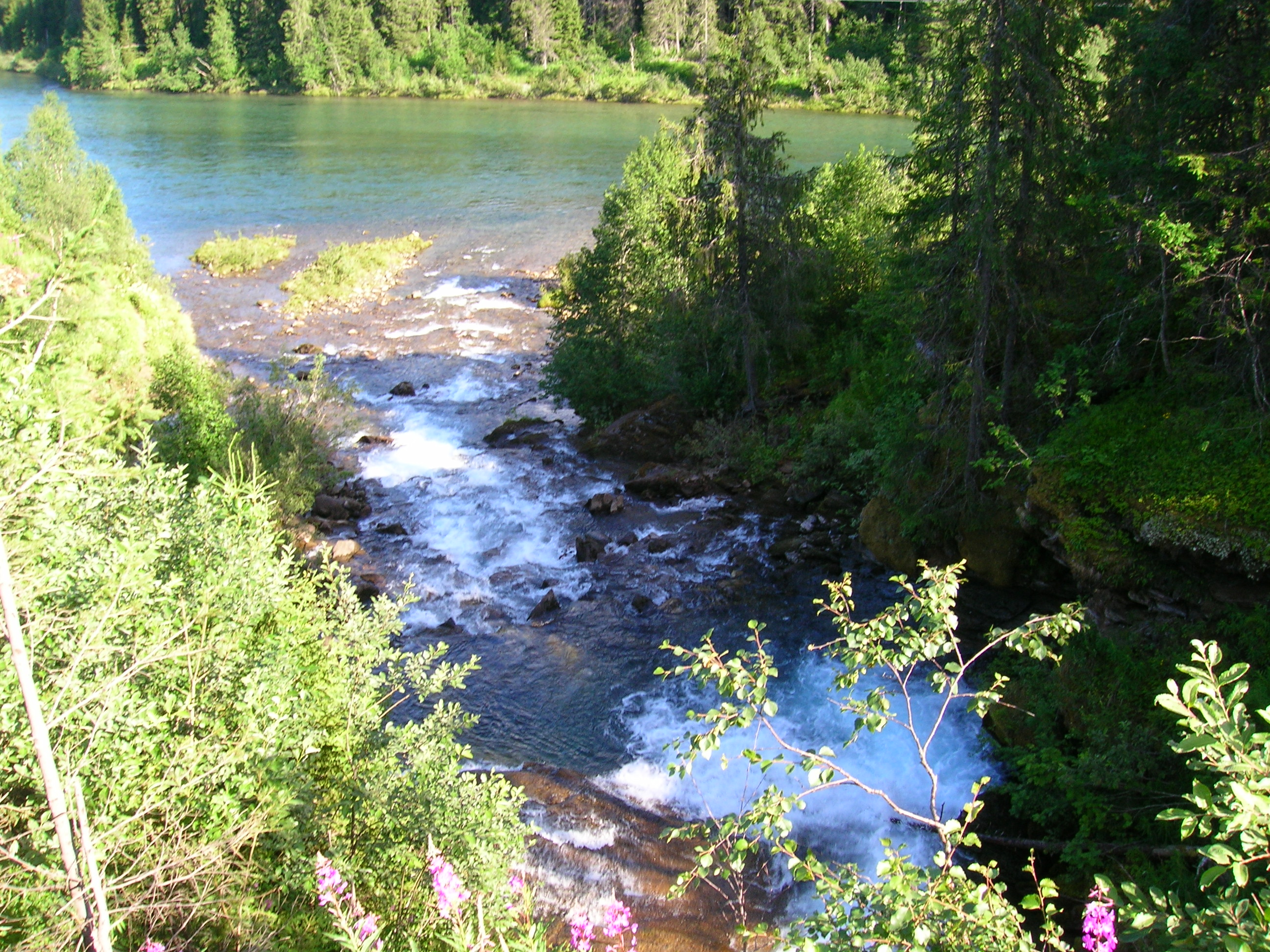
The outlet of Eiteråa into Ranelva

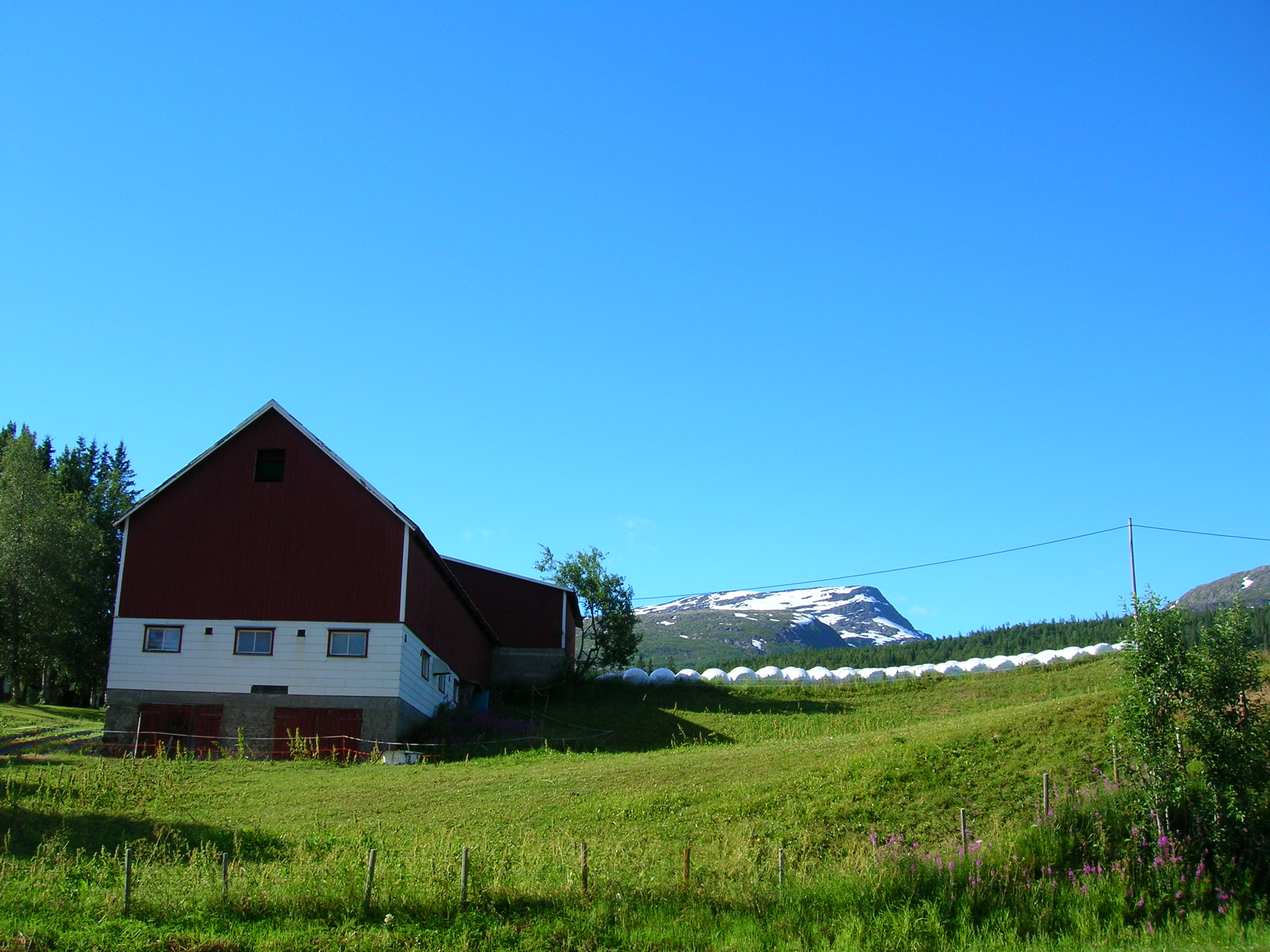
Eiterå farm

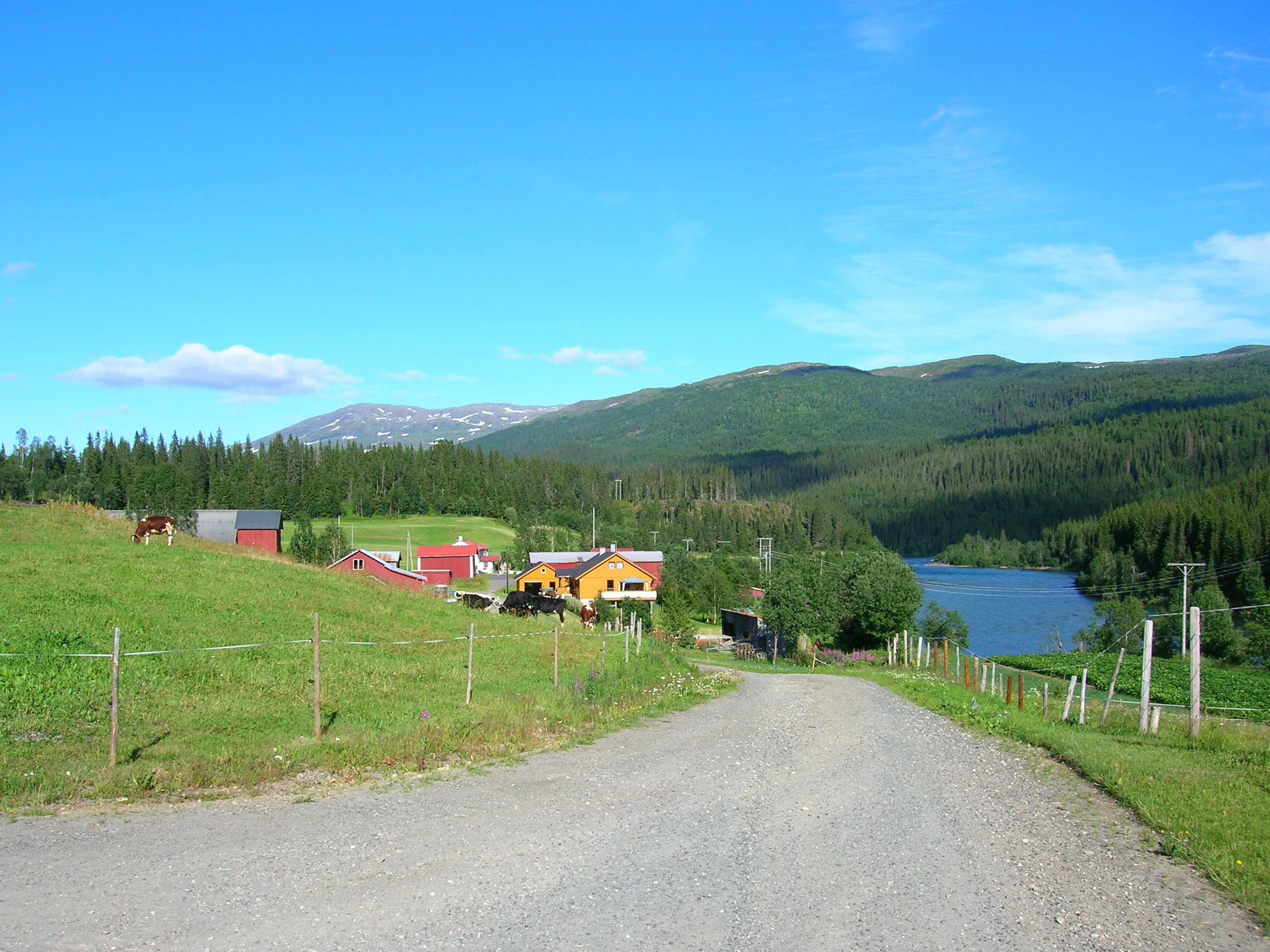
Eiterå farm
