= Illhøllia Tunnel =

Tunnel in Rana, Norway

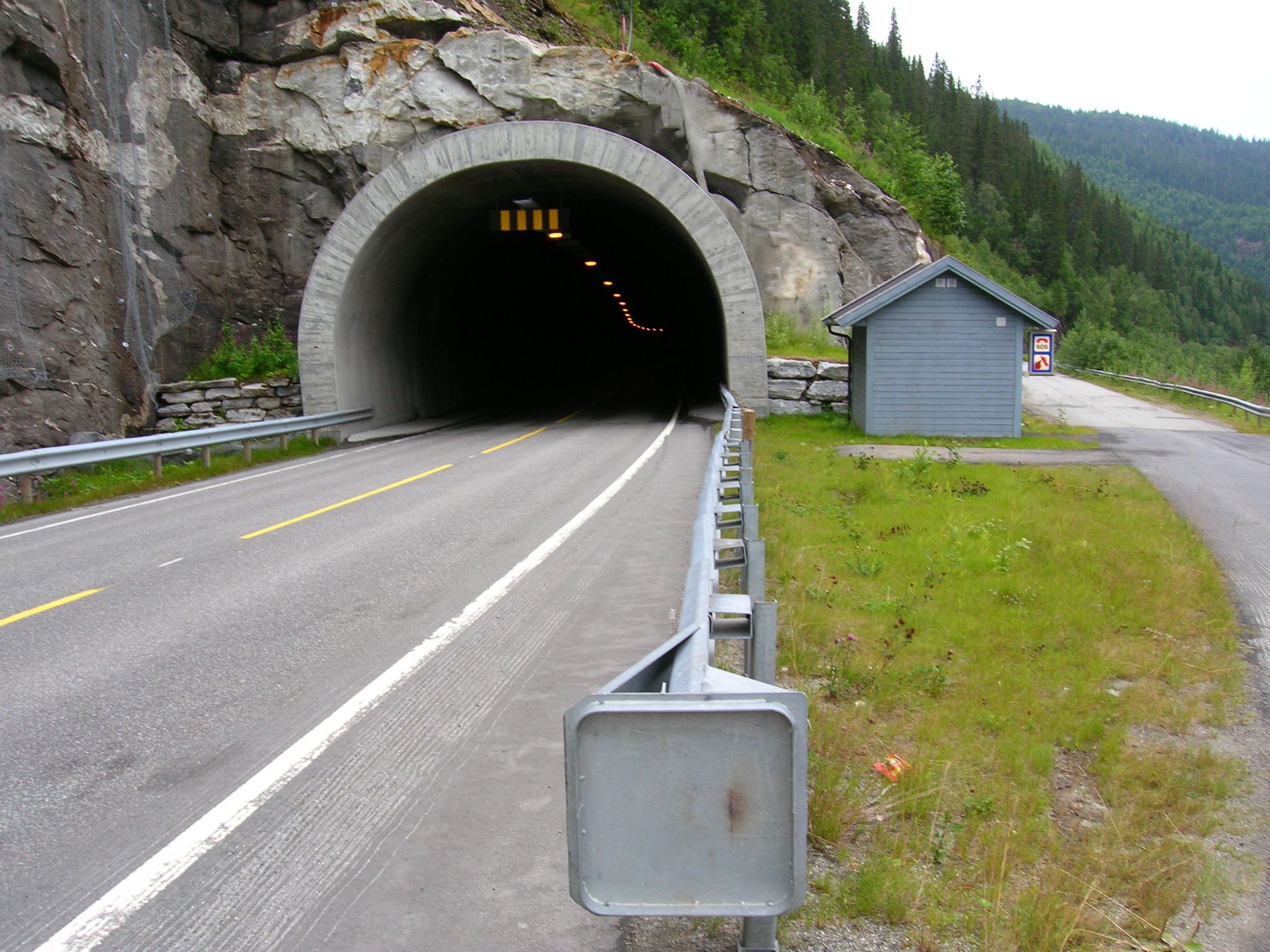
- Southern entrance to the tunnel

Overview
- Location: Rana Municipality, Nordland, Norway
- Coordinates: 66.3879°N 14.3938°E
- Route: E06

Operation
- Opened: 2002
- Traffic: Automotive

Technical
- Length: 1,262 metres (4,140 ft)
- No. of lanes: 2

The Illhøllia Tunnel (Norwegian: Illhøllia tunnel, sometimes spelled Ildhøllia) is a 1,262-metre (4,140 ft) long tunnel on European route E06 in the Dunderland Valley in Rana Municipality in Nordland county, Norway. The tunnel was opened in 2002. The tunnel is located in an area with very steep mountains along the Ranelva river. Before the opening of the tunnel, European route E06 had to be continuously repaired because the road was about to collapse into the river due to erosion from the small brooks flowing down the mountains and going beneath the road.

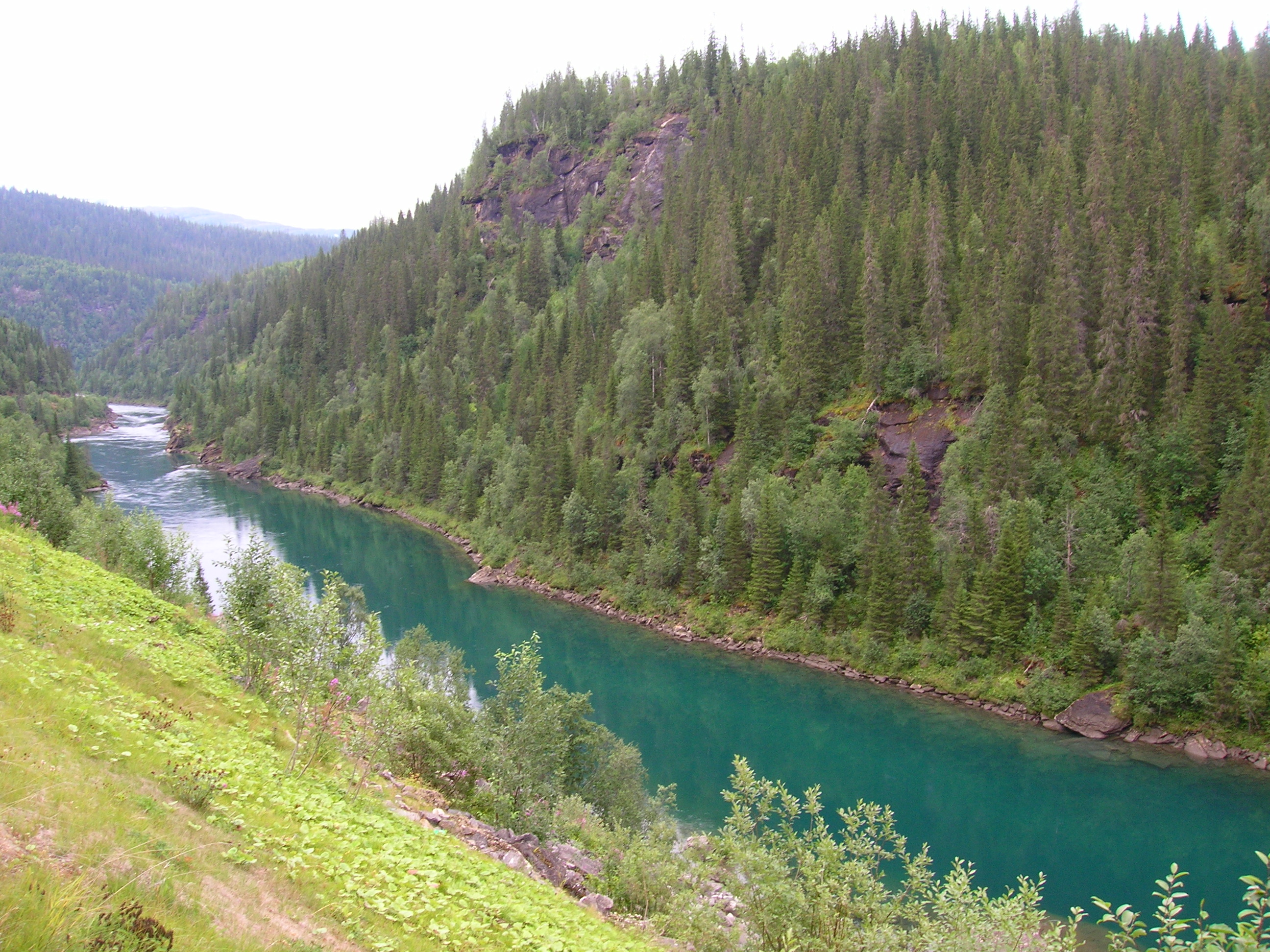
Ranelva river valley, see from the southern entrance

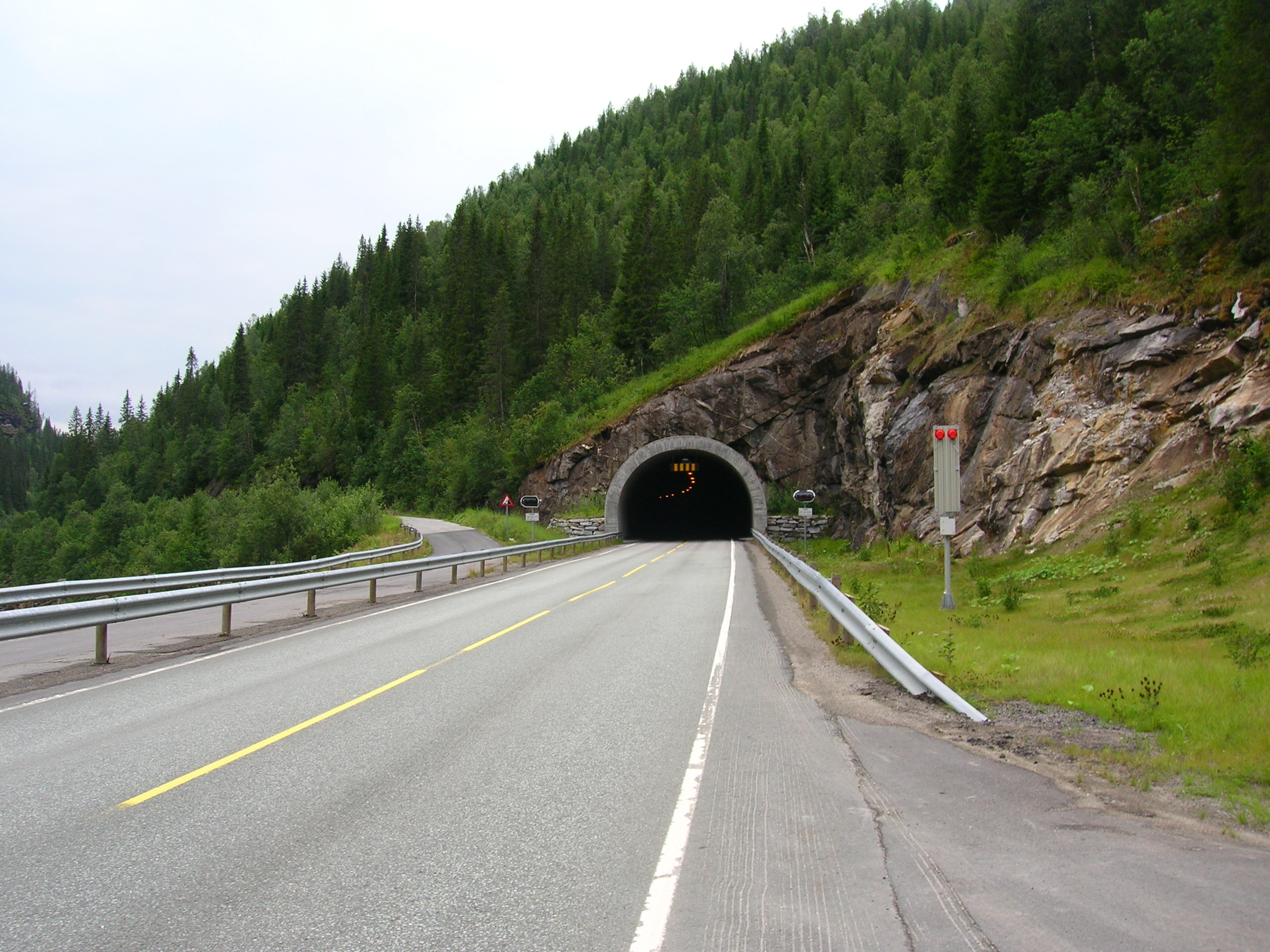
Northern entrance

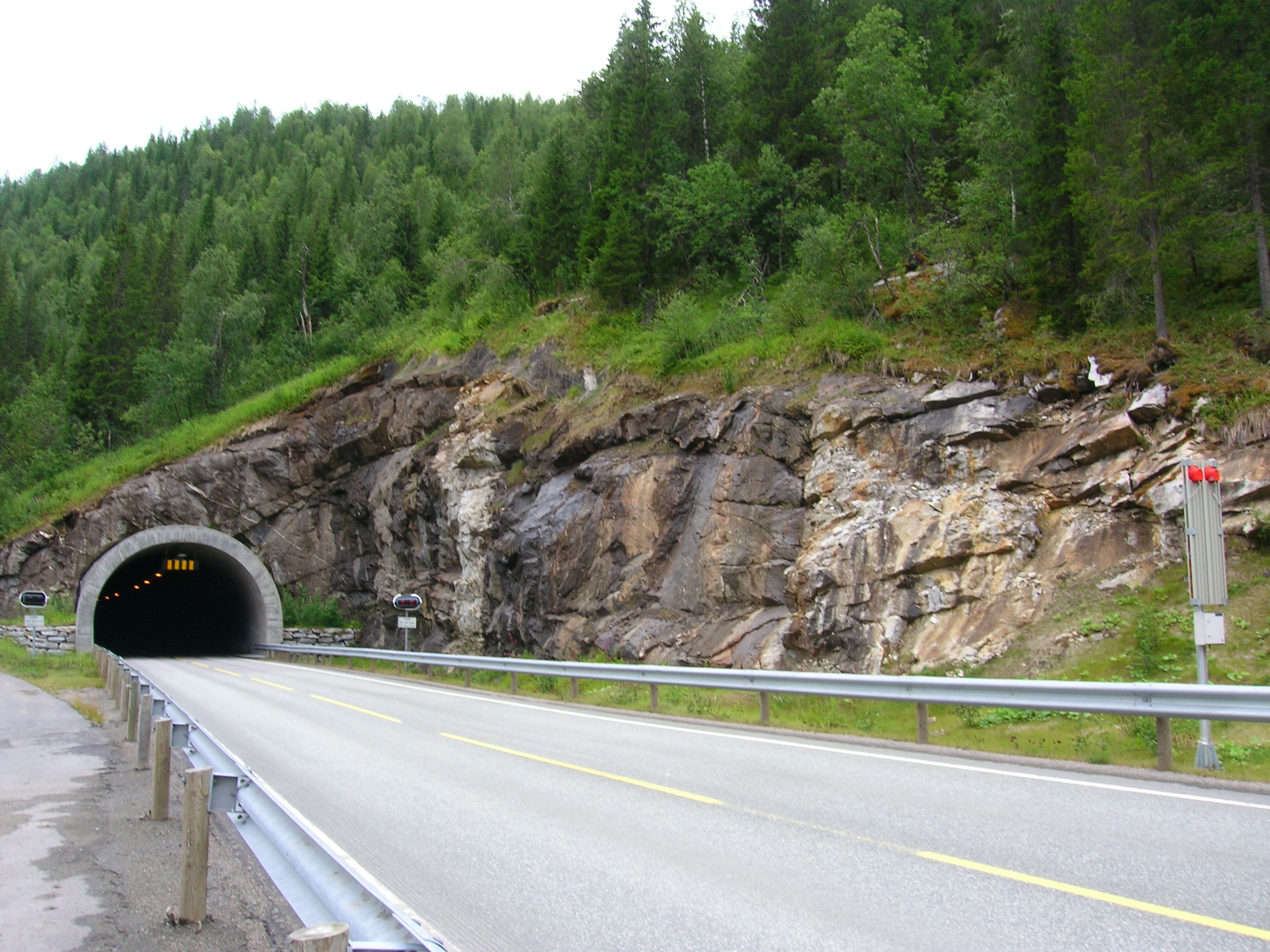
Northern entrance
