= Grønfjellåga =

River in Nordland, Norway

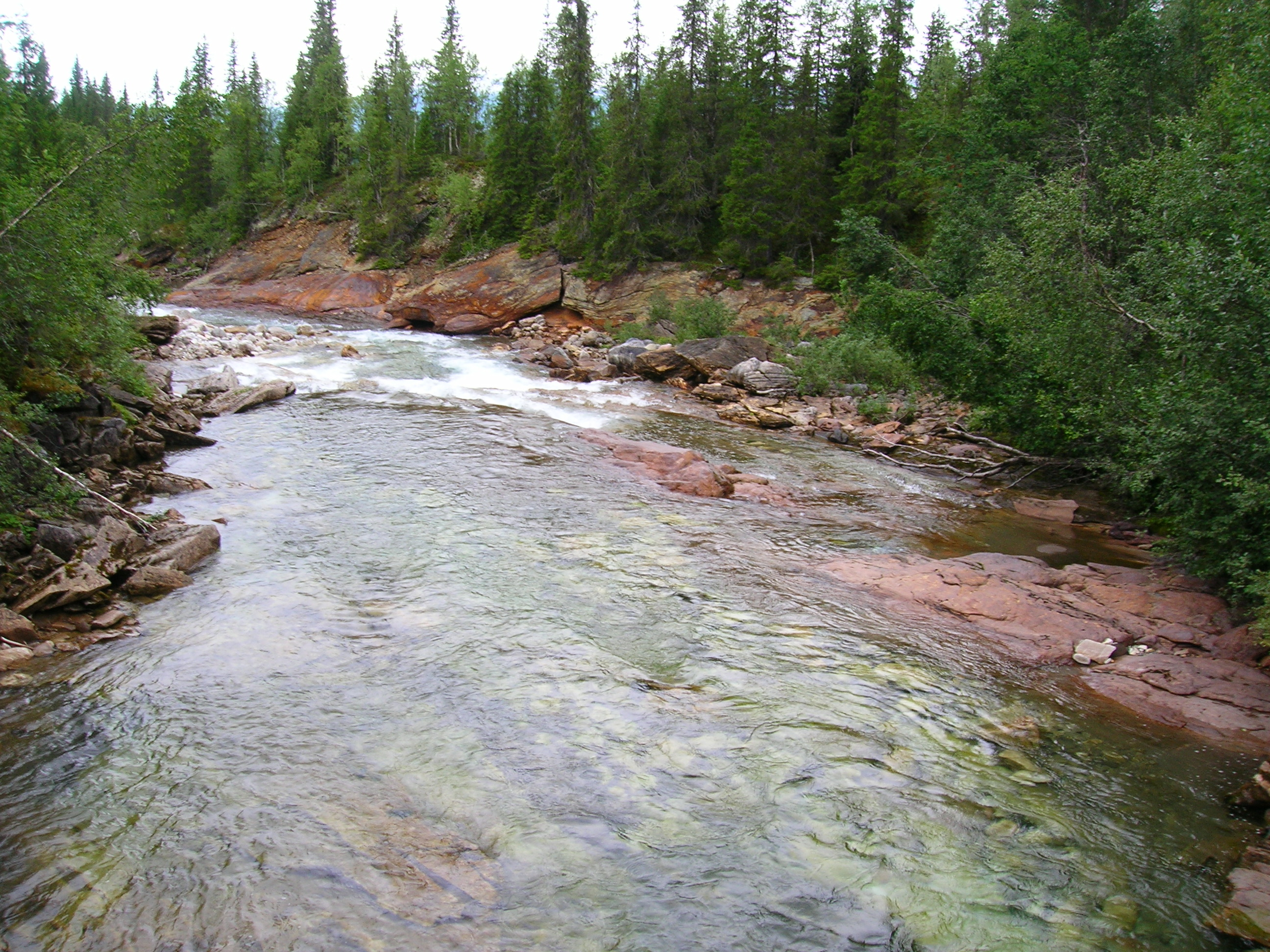

Location
- Country: Norway
- County: Nordland
- Municipalities: Rana Municipality

Physical characteristics
- Source: Kopparvassdalen valley
  - location: Rana Municipality, Norway
  - coordinates: 66.333026°N 14.871733°E
  - elevation: 440 metres (1,440 ft)
- Mouth: Ranelva river
  - location: Nevernes, Rana Municipality
  - coordinates: 66.37332°N 14.592397°E
  - elevation: 83 metres (272 ft)
- Length: 17 km (11 mi)

Grønfjellåga (lit. 'green mountain river') is a river in Rana Municipality in Nordland county, Norway. The 17-kilometre (11 mi) long river's source is the lakes Kallvatnet and Kopparvatnet. It then flows through the Grønfjelldalen valley while absorbing several smaller rivers, before it flows out as a tributary to the river Ranelva at the Dunderforsen waterfall (also called Stupforsen).

== Media gallery ==
These photos are from a place 3.5 kilometres (2.2 mi) east of Stupforsen:

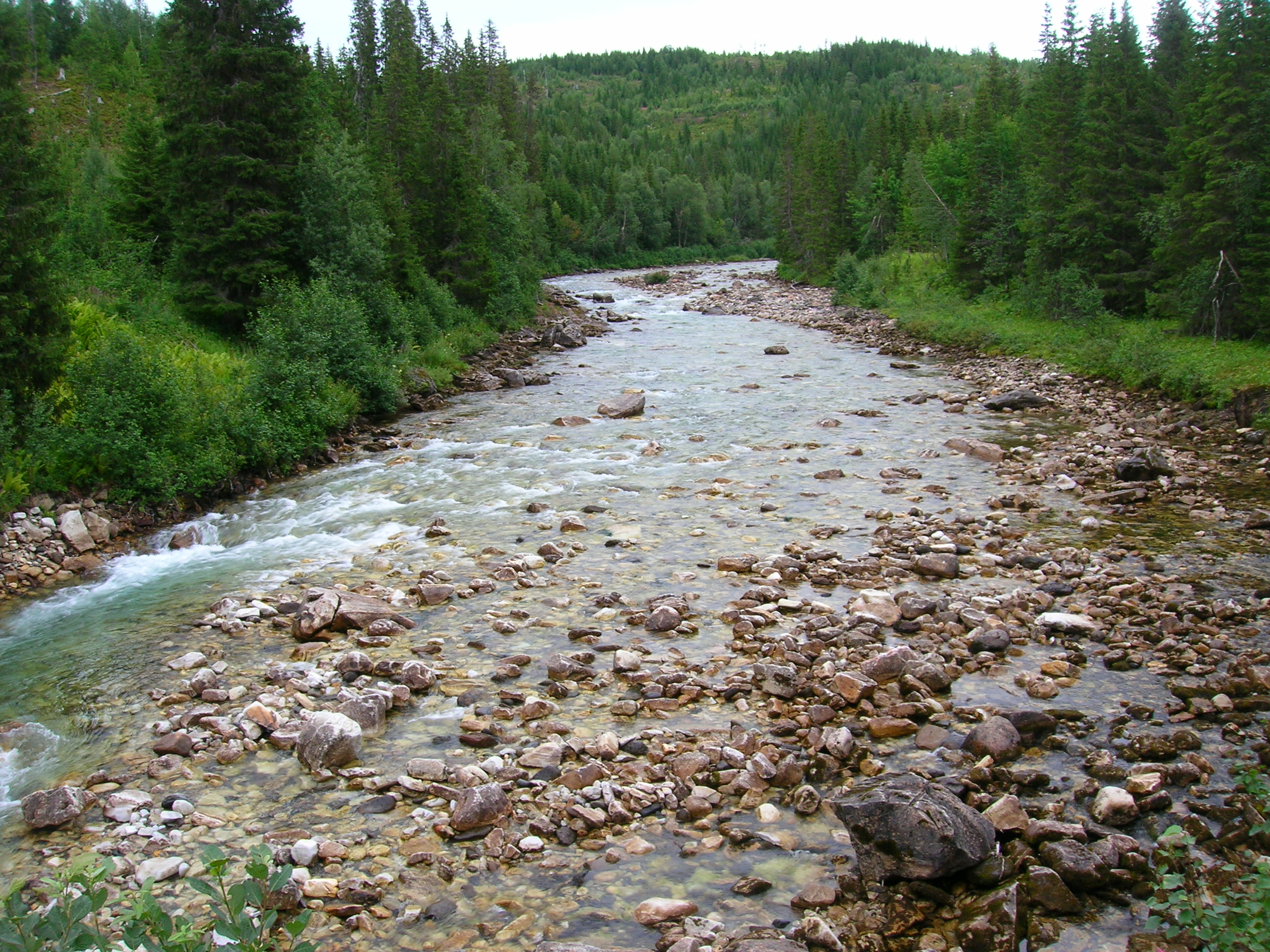

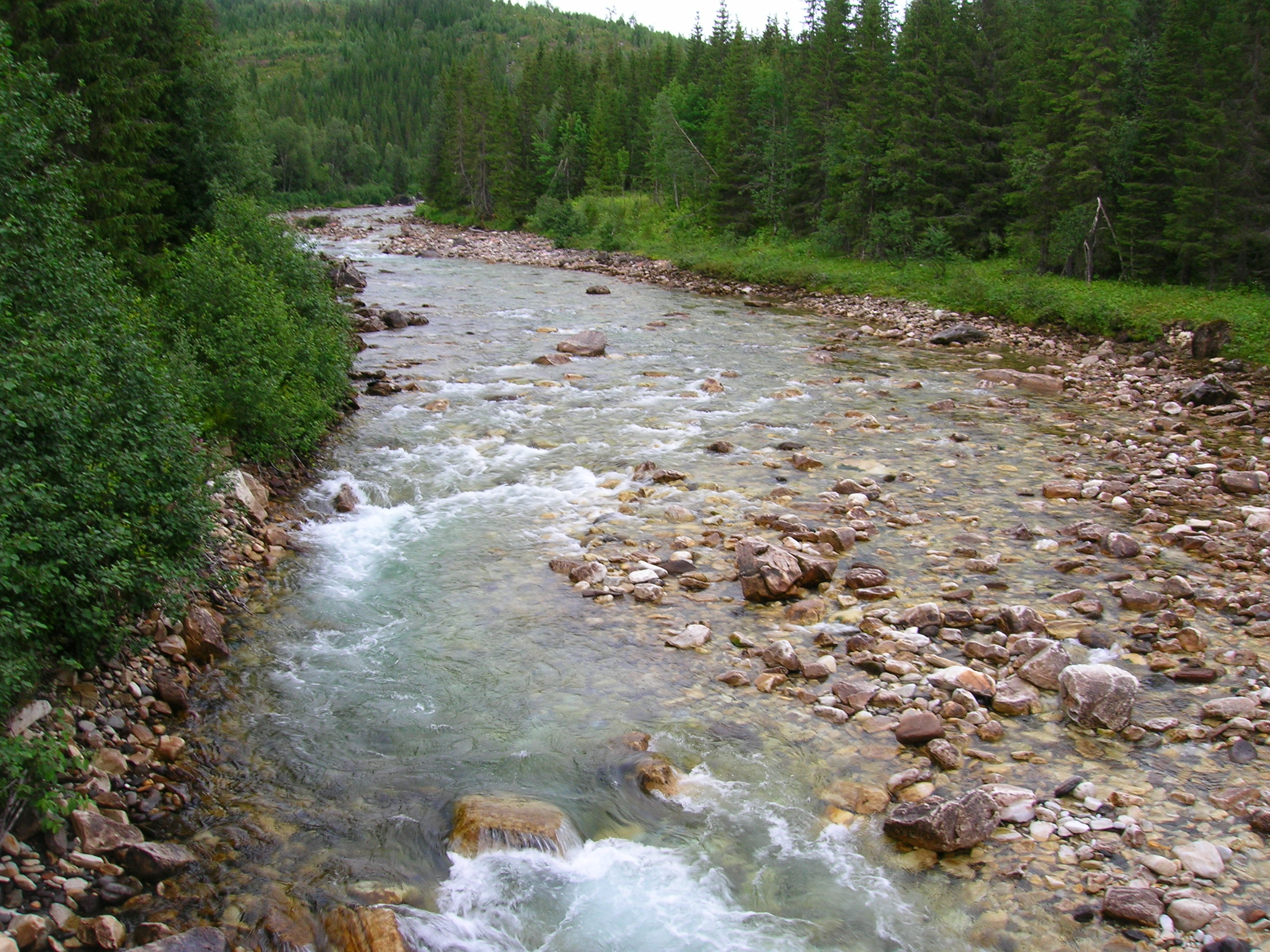

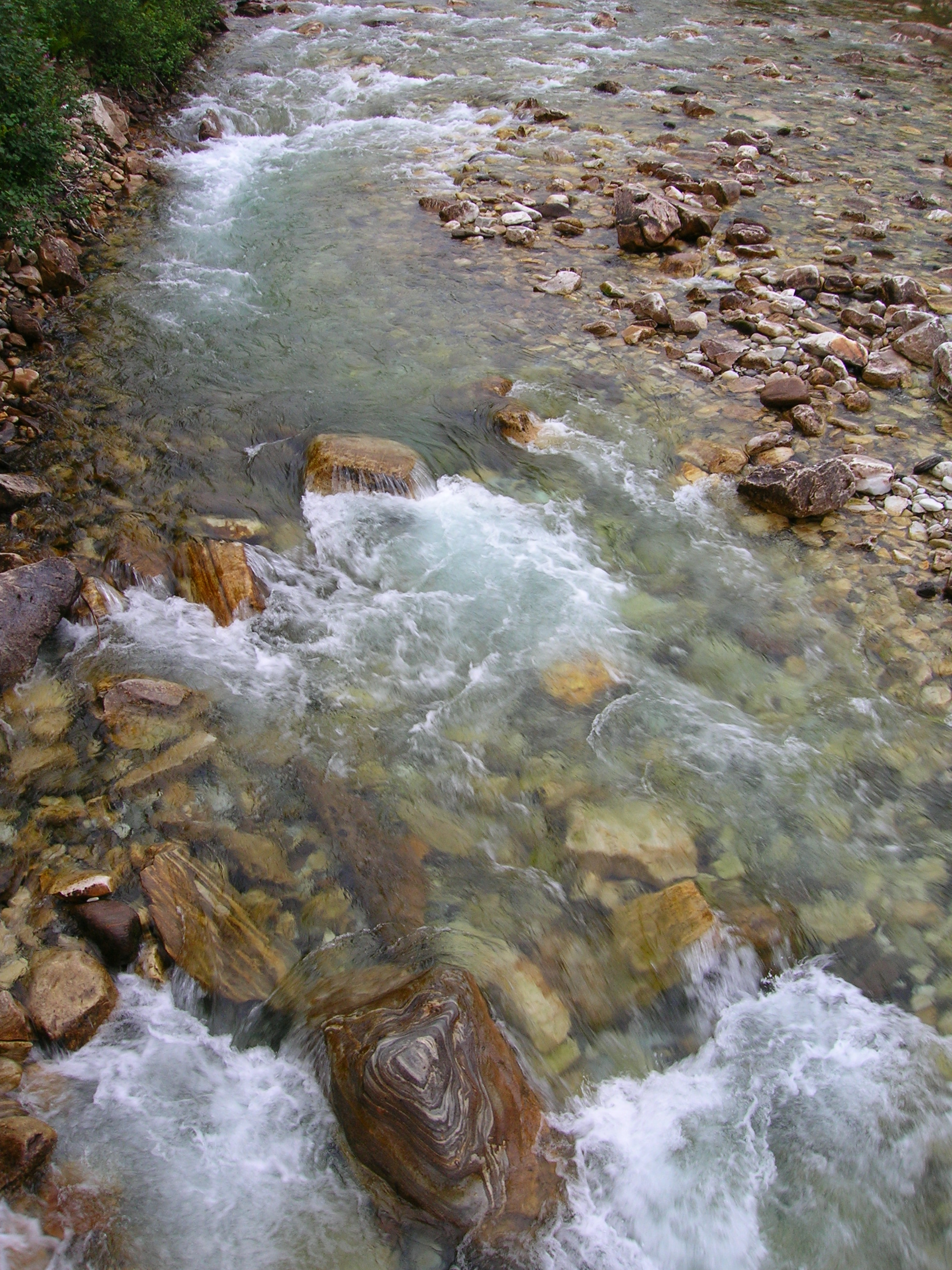

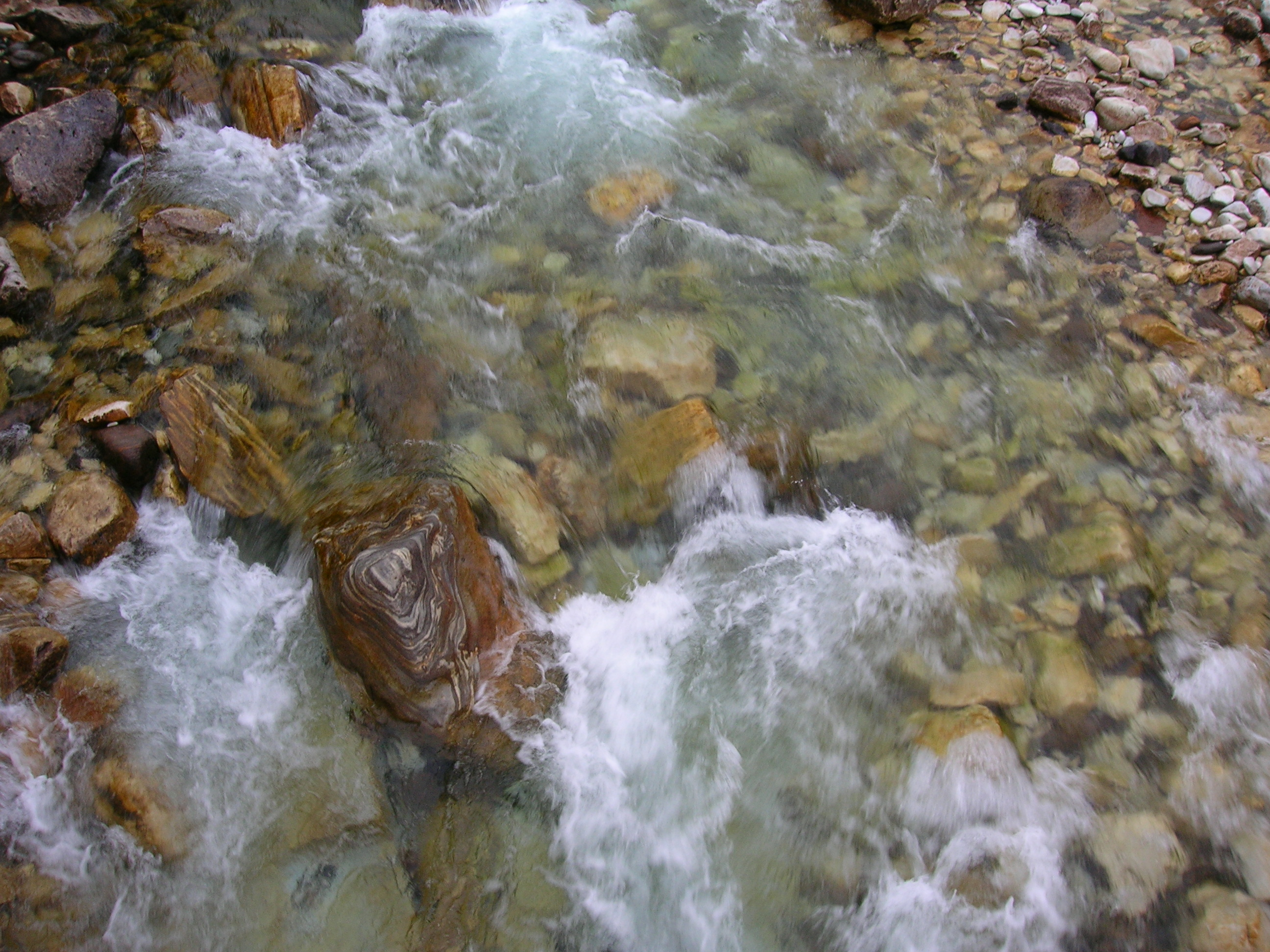

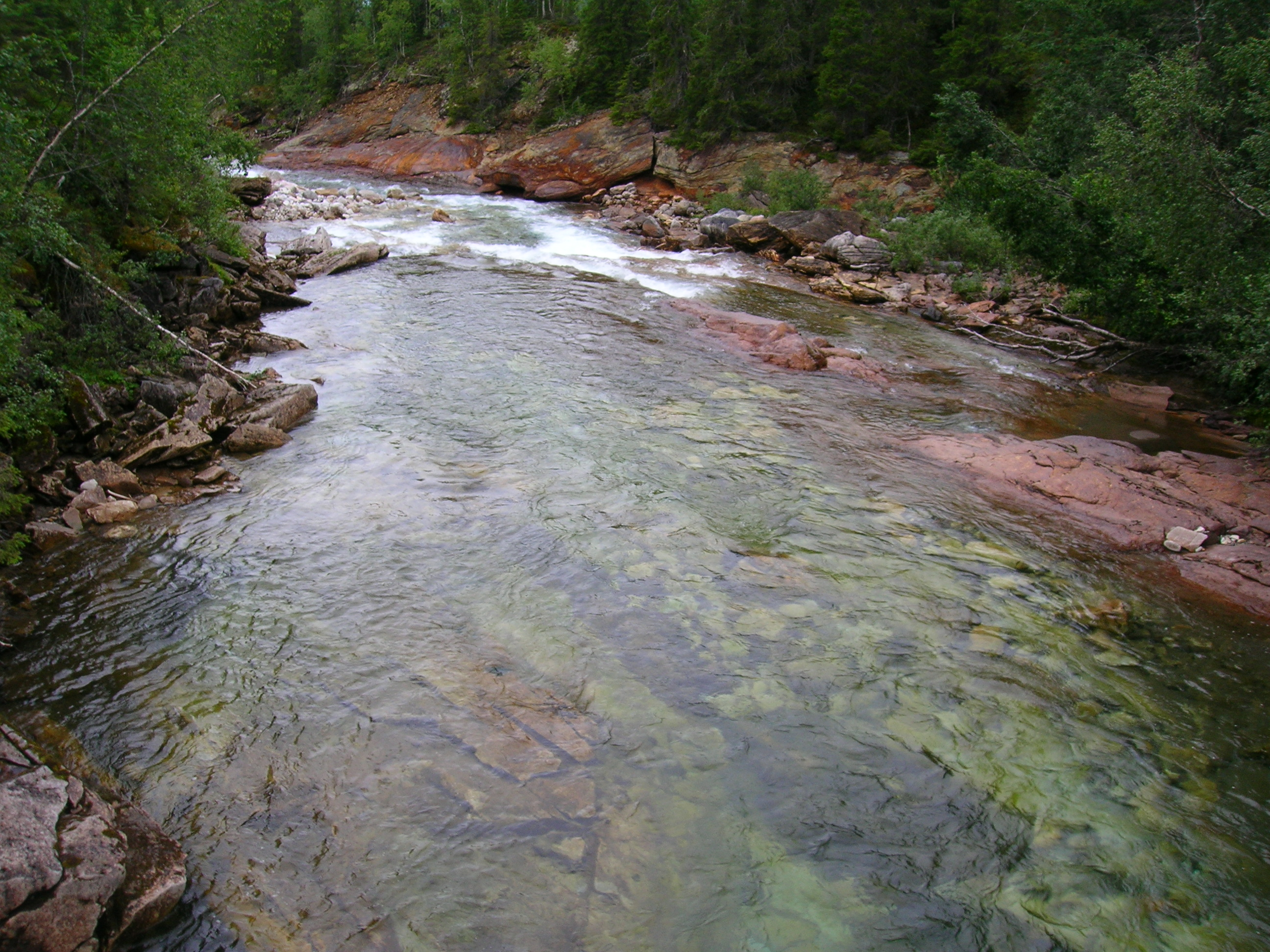

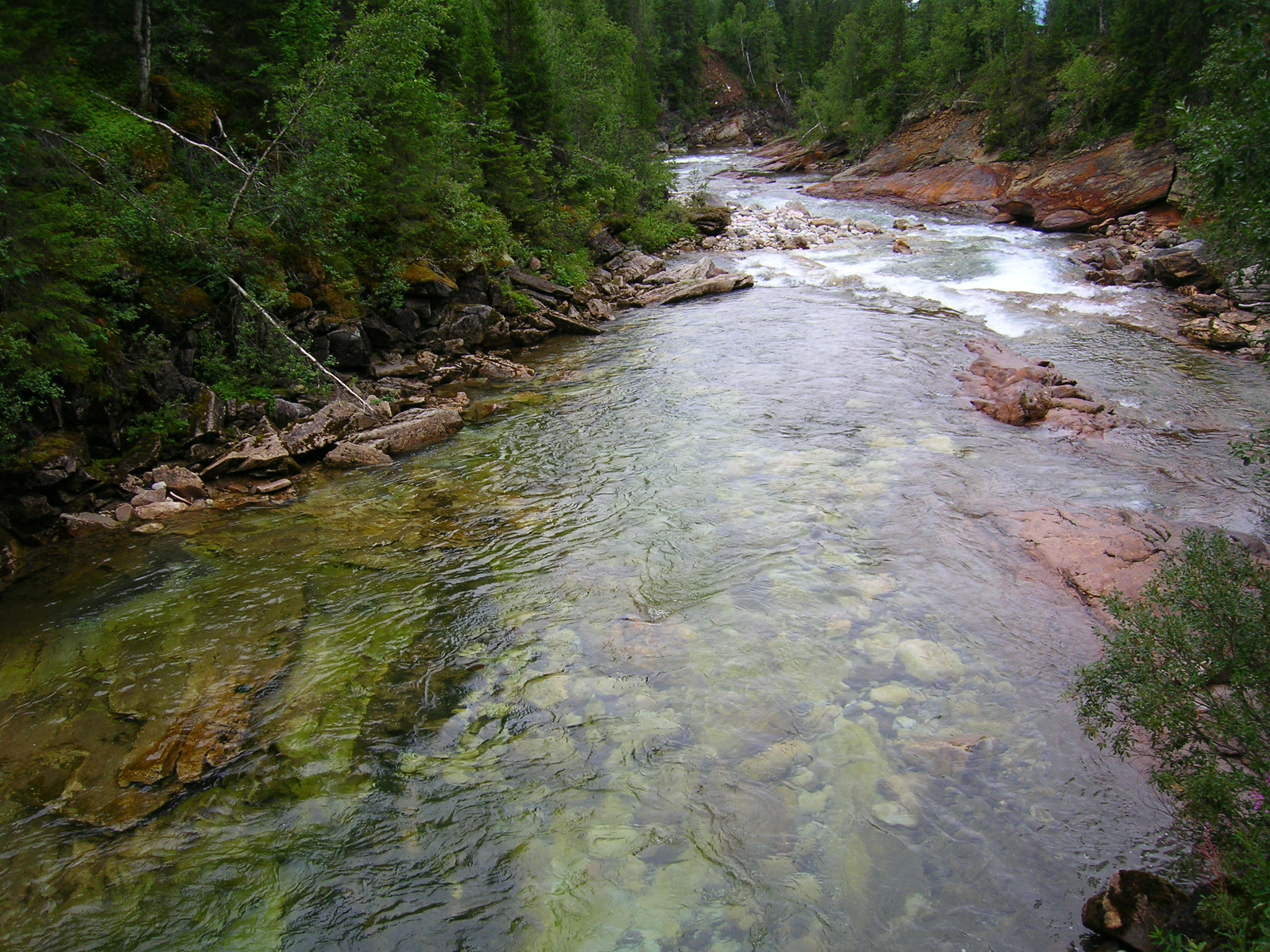

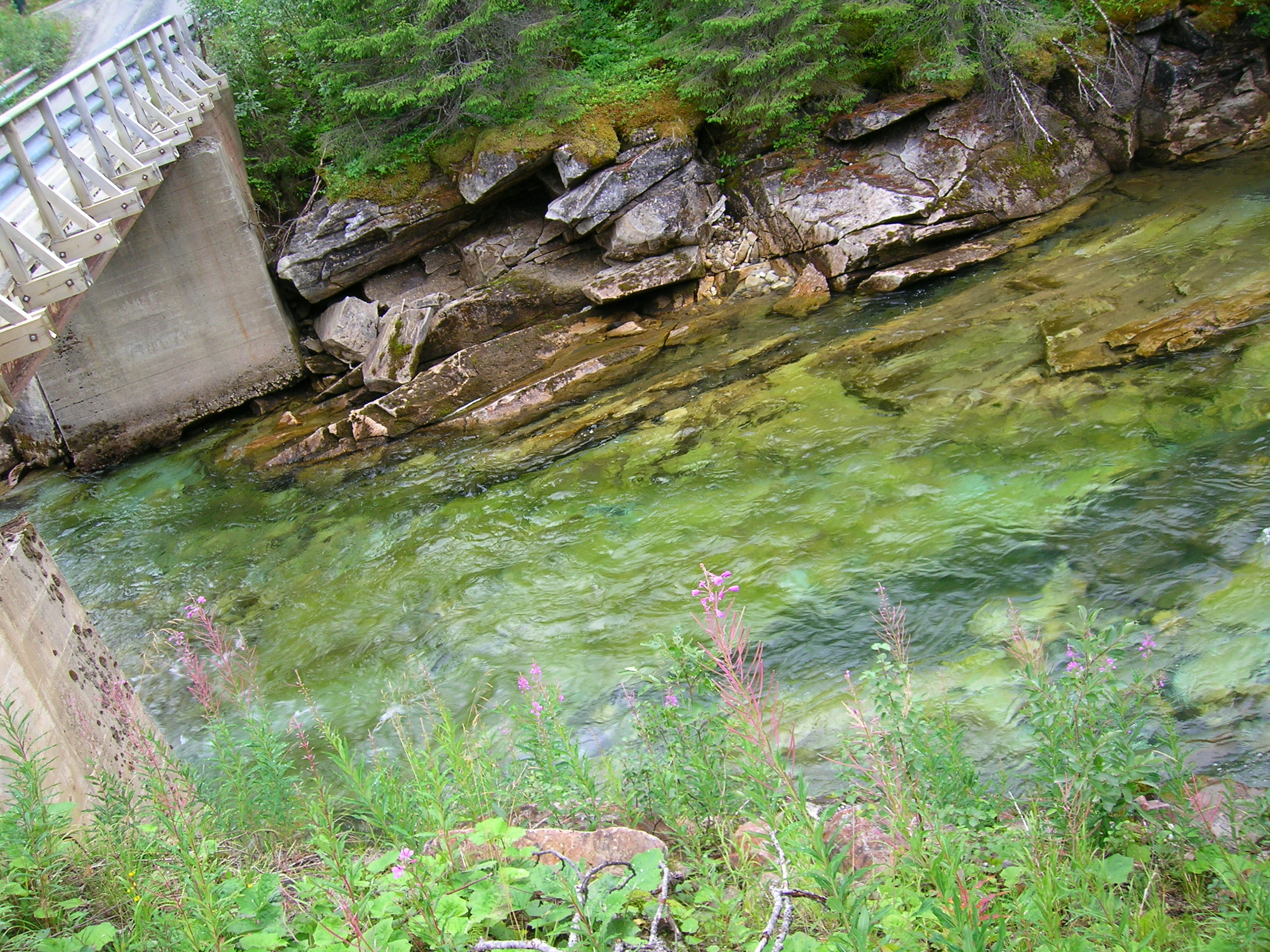
