= Grønfjelldalen =

Valley in Nordland, Norway

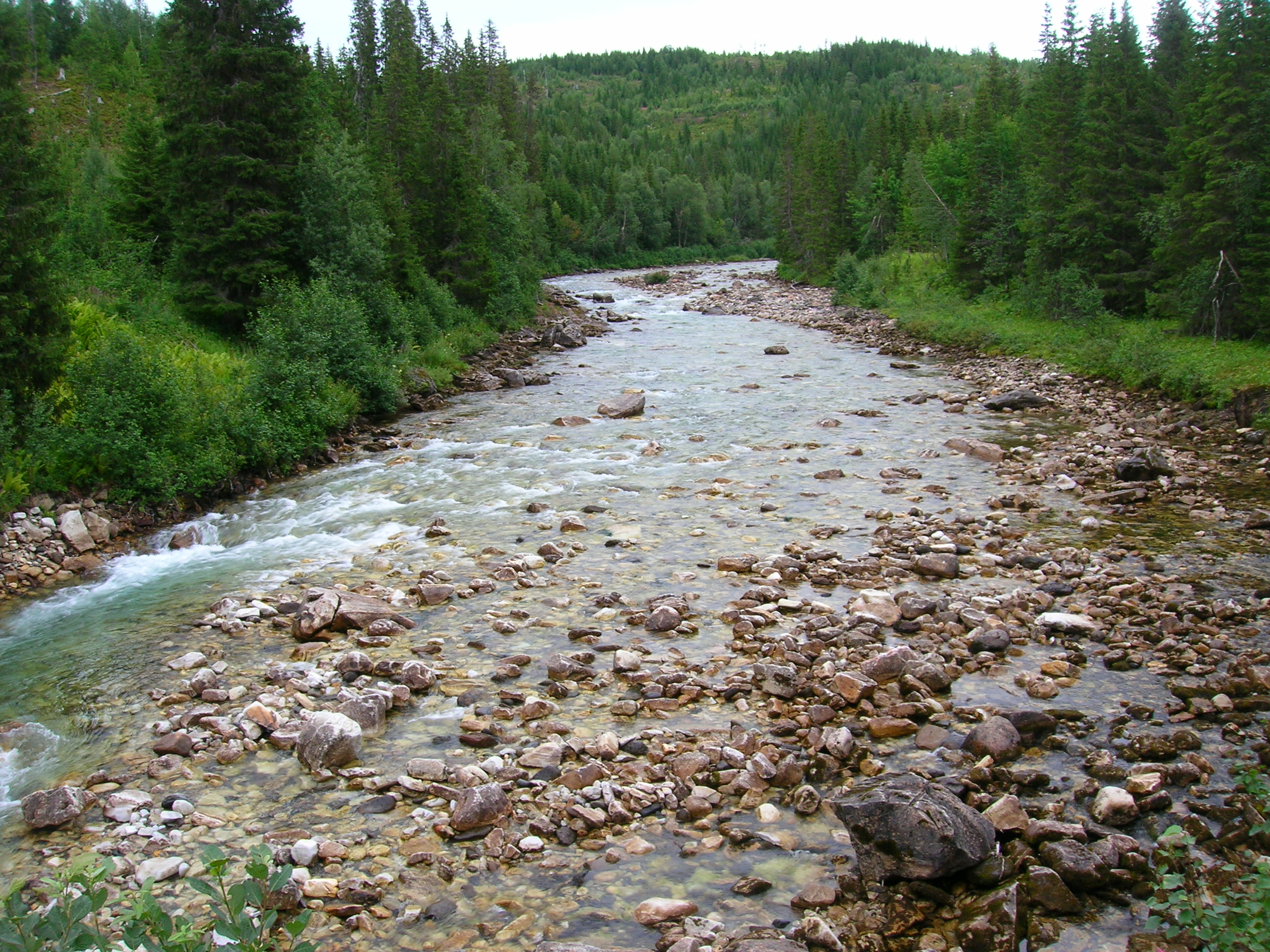
- View of the river that flows through the valley
- Length: 15 kilometres (9.3 mi)

Geology
- Type: River valley

Geography
- Location: Nordland, Norway
- Coordinates: 66°21′05″N 14°38′01″E

Location
- Interactive map of the valley

Grønfjelldalen is a valley in Rana Municipality in Nordland county, Norway. It is a side valley off of the main Dunderland Valley. The river Grønfjellåga runs from the lake Kallvatnet down through the valley, flowing into the main river Ranelva near Grønnfjelldal Station.
