= Bolna Station =

Railway station in Rana, Norway

Bolna Station Bolna stasjon
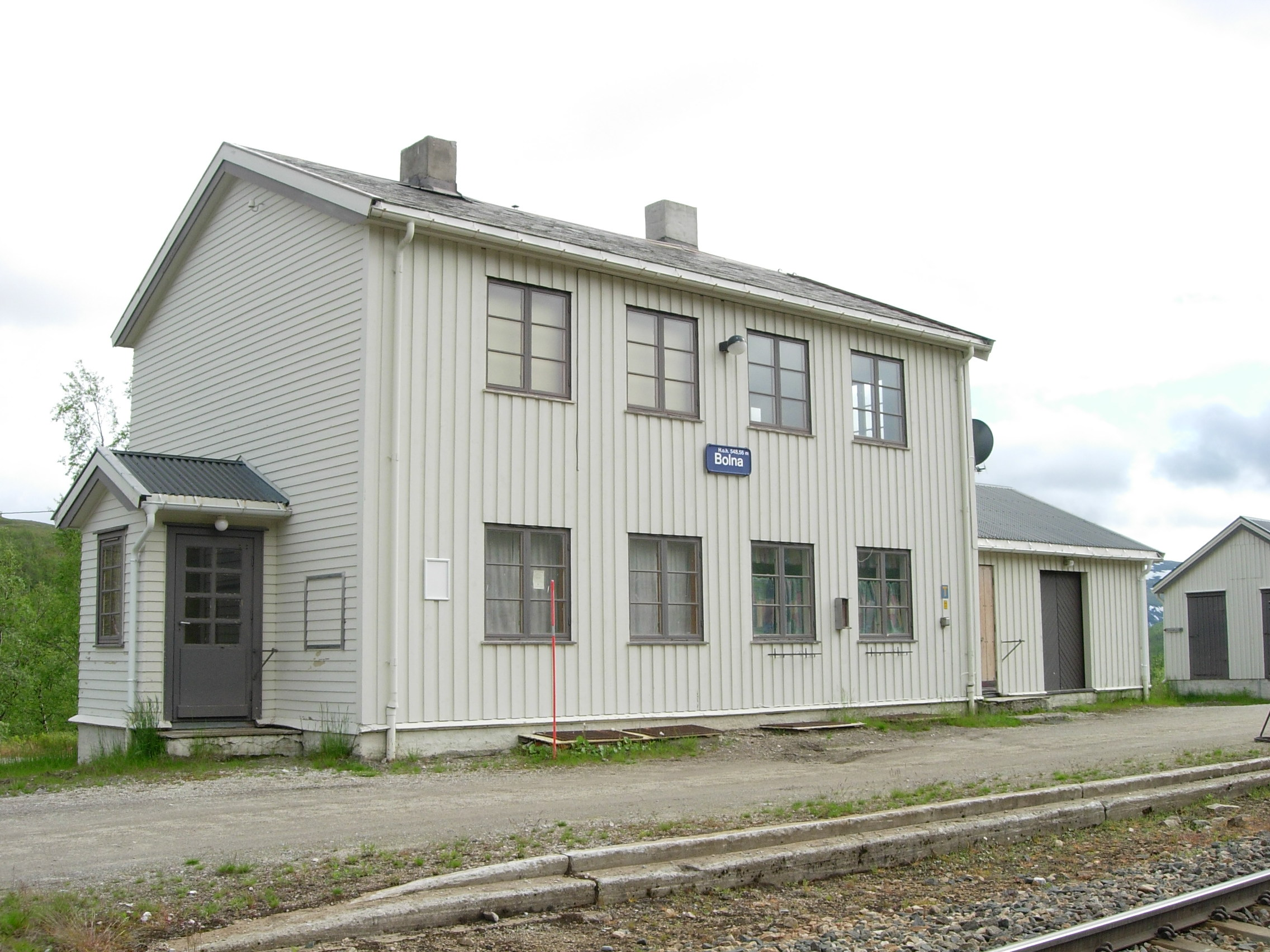
- View of the station

General information
- Location: Bolna, Rana Municipality; Norway
- Coordinates: 66.4935°N 15.2390°E
- Elevation: 549.6 m (1,803 ft) above sea level
- System: Railway station
- Owner: Bane NOR
- Line: Nordlandsbanen
- Distance: 28.04 km (17.42 mi)

Other information
- Station code: BOA

History
- Opened: 1947
Location
- Location within Nordland Location within Norway

Bolna Station (Norwegian: Bolna stasjon) is a train station on the Nordland Line at Bolna in Rana Municipality in Nordland county, Norway. It is located in the upper Dunderland Valley, along the Ranelva river, between the mountains Bolna and Nasafjellet in the eastern part of the municipality, just 6 kilometres (3.7 mi) west of the border with Sweden. The station is located along the European route E06 highway about 28 kilometres (17 mi) northeast of Dunderland Station. The station opened in 1947, but it is now closed to regular traffic.

Preceding station		Following station
Lønsdal	Nordland Line	Dunderland
