= Dunderland =

Village in Rana Municipality, Norway

- Village
- Interactive map of Dunderland
- Location within Nordland Location within Norway
- Coordinates: 66.4456°N 14.8389°E
- Country: Norway
- Region: Northern Norway
- County: Nordland
- District: Helgeland
- Municipality: Rana Municipality
- Elevation: 131 m (430 ft)
- Time zone: UTC+01:00 (CET)
  - Summer (DST): UTC+02:00 (CEST)
- Post Code: 8630 Storforshei

Dunderland is a village in Rana Municipality in Nordland county, Norway. The village is located in the Dunderland Valley, along the Ranelva river, about 10 kilometres (6.2 mi) northeast of the village of Eiteråga and about 40 kilometres (25 mi) from the town of Mo i Rana.

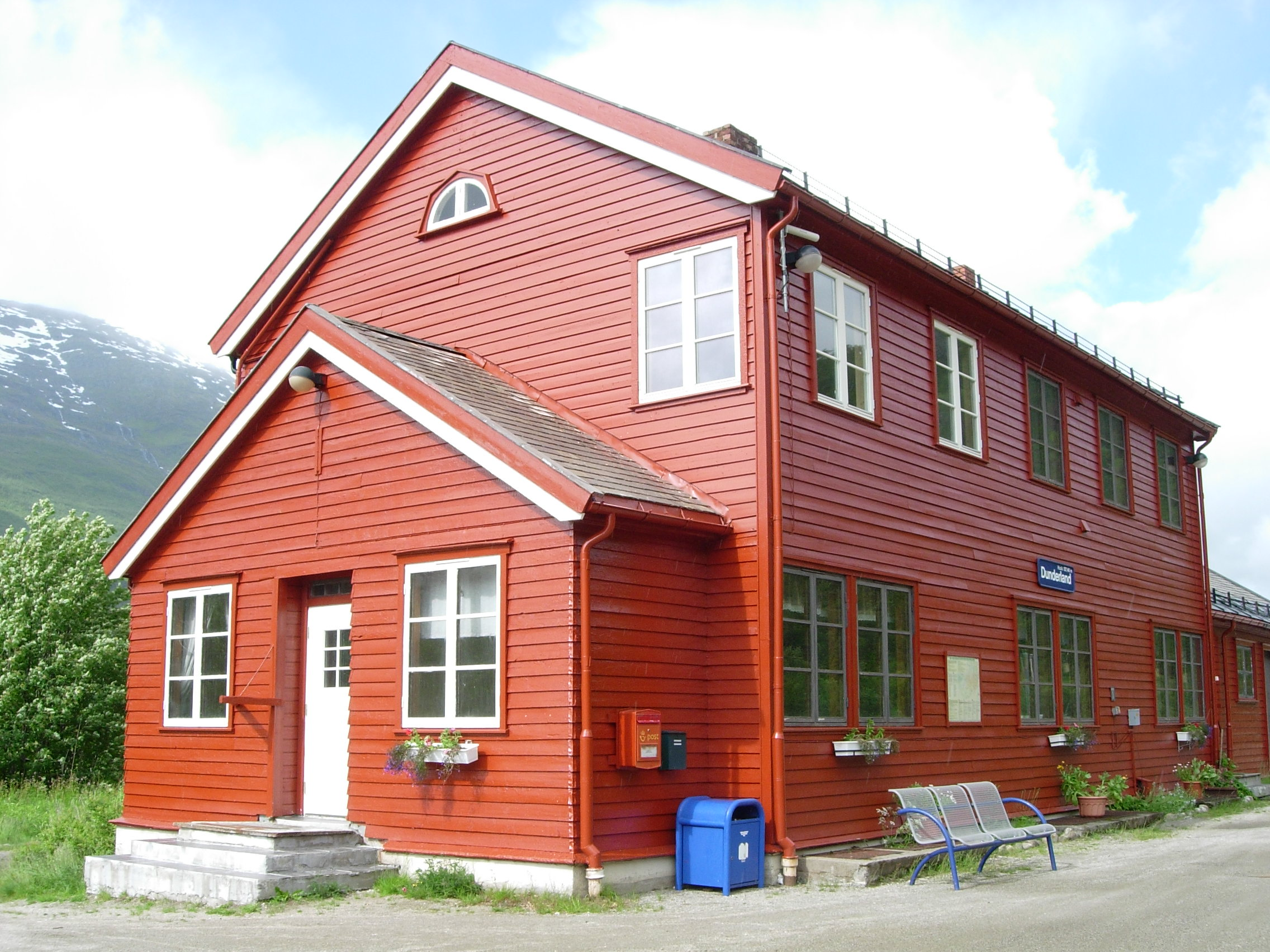
Dunderland Station

The village has a train station, Dunderland Station, on the Nordland Line, between the villages of Skonseng and Lønsdal. The station is situated at an elevation of 127 metres (417 ft) above sea level.
