= Bolna, Rana =

Mountain in Rana, Norway

Bolna (Norwegian) Bållná (Lule Sami)
- Historic: Båldno (Lule Sami)
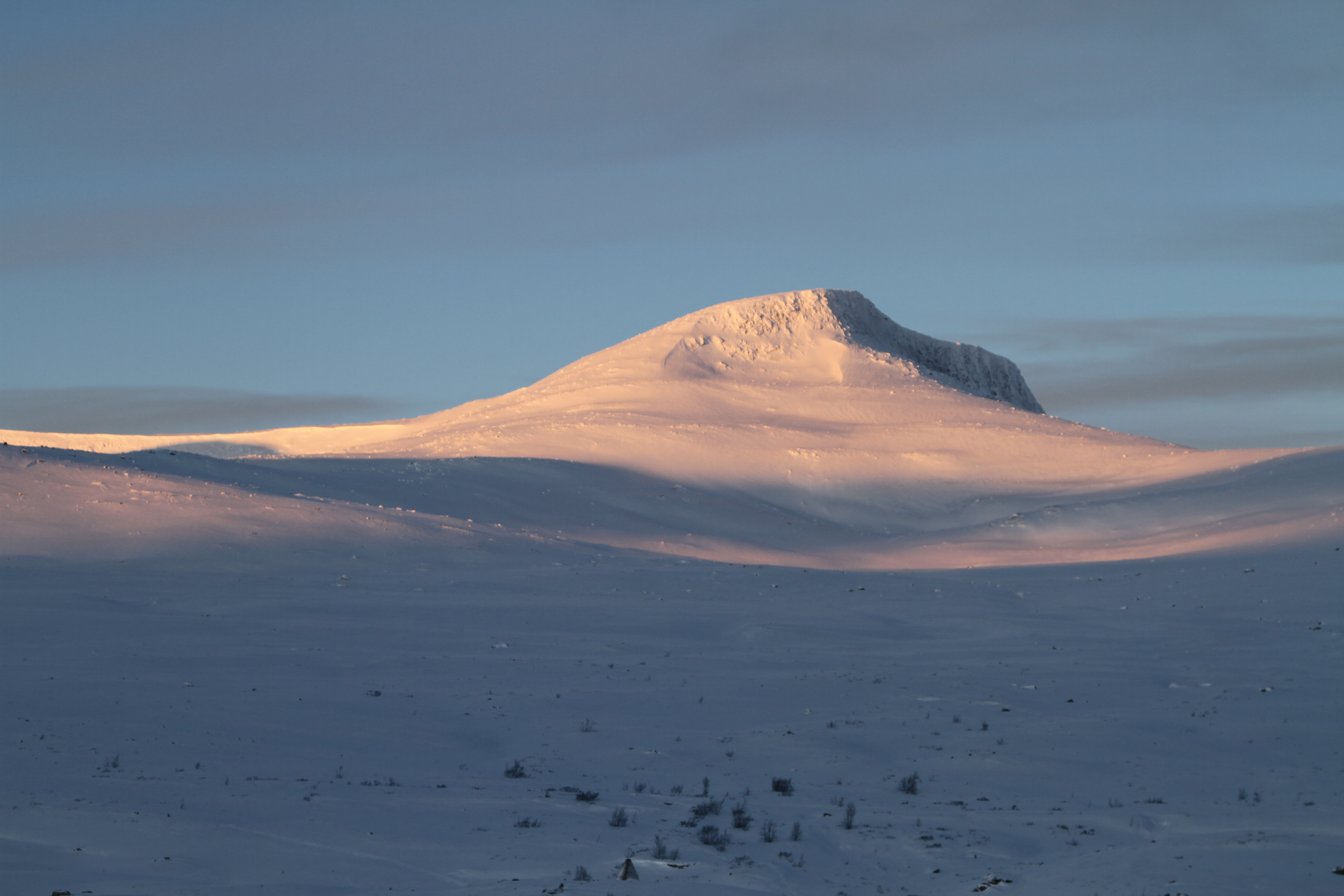

Highest point
- Elevation: 1,460 m (4,790 ft)
- Coordinates: 66.5906°N 15.1695°E

Geography
- Interactive map of the mountain
- Location: Nordland, Norway
- Parent range: Saltfjellet

Bolna (Norwegian) or Bållná (Lule Sami) is a mountain in the Saltfjellet mountain range in Rana Municipality in Nordland county, Norway. The mountain peak reaches 1,460 metres (4,790 ft) above sea level, and is located just north of the Arctic Circle inside Saltfjellet–Svartisen National Park. The mountain peak is located less than 2 kilometres (1.2 mi) west of the border with Saltdal Municipality and about 15 kilometres (9.3 mi) west of the border with Sweden.

At the southeastern foot of the mountain sits Bolna Station, a railway station on the Nordland Line. The Norwegian Mountain Touring Association has a mountain lodge named Bolnastua located only 200 metres (660 ft) from the railway station. The cabin was completed in 1993 and has 13 beds. The European route E6 highway and the river Ranelva both pass along the south and eastern side of the mountain. The station and Bolnastua cabin are both situated in a mountain birch forest near the treeline.
