= Selfors =

Village in Rana Municipality, Norway

- Neighborhood in Mo i Rana
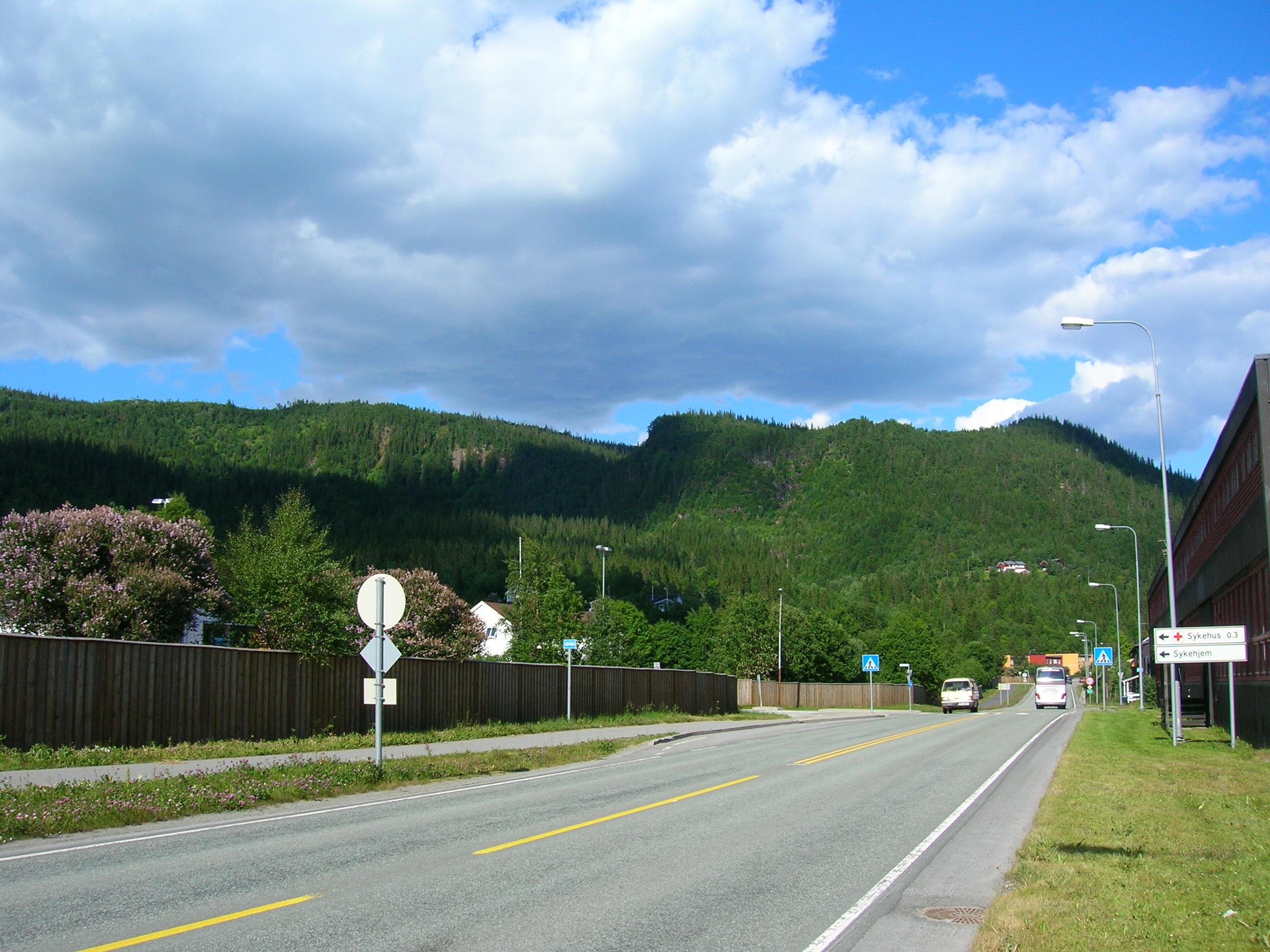
- View of the E6 highway passing through Selfors
- Interactive map of Selfors
- Location within Nordland Location within Norway
- Coordinates: 66.3269°N 14.1744°E
- Country: Norway
- Region: Northern Norway
- County: Nordland
- District: Helgeland
- Municipality: Rana Municipality
- Elevation: 24 m (79 ft)
- Time zone: UTC+01:00 (CET)
  - Summer (DST): UTC+02:00 (CEST)
- Post Code: 8604 Mo i Rana

Selfors is a neighborhood in the town of Mo i Rana in Rana Municipality in Nordland county, Norway. Selfors sits on the northern shore of the river Ranelva in the northeastern part of the town of Mo i Rana. The European route E06 highway passes through the neighborhood. Selfors has been inhabited since the Iron Age.

The Helgeland Hospital Mo i Rana, the local branch of the Helgeland Hospital, is located on Selfors. There are also two daycare centres, a primary school, and school with secondary classes. In connection with the expansion of the Norsk Jernverk iron and metal industry company in 1946, Selfors Church was originally built by the Catholic Church. It was built in 1971 and constructed mainly out of glass and wood. It seats 200. Since 1976, however, it has also been used by the Church of Norway.

Additionally, Selfors has a grocery store (which includes the local post office); a flower shop; a store for hunting, fishing and outdoor life; a petrol station; and an inn located along European route E06. There are six housing cooperatives in Selfors, owned by Mo og Omegn Boligbyggelag.

== Transportation ==
The Selfors Bridge over the Ranelva river on the E6 highway connects Selfors with the town centre of Mo i Rana. The first bridge at Selfors was built in 1914. On 18 May 1940, it was blown up by the resistance in order to slow down the northward advance of the German occupation forces. It was, however, quickly rebuilt, and was used until it was torn down on 17 March 1965. A new bridge was then built, and is still in use today.

Before the opening of the new bridge between Mjølan and Ytteren, Selfors Bridge was the only road connection between Mo i Rana and the northern suburbs of Ytteren and Båsmoen.

The hillsides and mountains at Selfors are a popular terrain for outdoor activities. Varmosletta, Skarvatnet, and Kvitbergan ("the white cliffs") are located in untouched nature.

== History ==
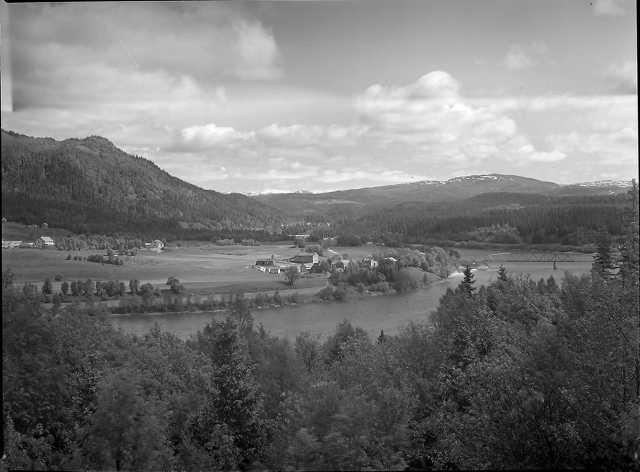
View of Selfors in 1948

=== Selfors farm ===
Selfors farm was one of the oldest farms in the area and it played a central role at that place until 1680. The farm was located along the river Ranelva on the western parts of the present-day village of Selfors, near the Ranfjorden and Fossetangen.

Selfors farm is mentioned in "the farm book of Aslak Bolt" in 1430, written by Aslak Harniktsson Bolt (ca.1380−1449), the Archbishop of Nidaros. Aslak Bolt wrote: "af selfosse 1/2 spann" Selfors thus paid 1/2 bucket of butter to the Archbishop of the Diocese of Nidaros.

The Leidang census during the years 1566−1567 does not mention the farm. It had probably not ceased to exist, but was rather forgotten, since the farmer during the census in 1610 was registered as a sailor and in 1612 as a bailiff. In the 17th century Selfors farm belonged to the Hemnes Church parish.

=== Name ===
The name Selfors was first mentioned in 1430. It has been interpreted as Sel-foss (Norwegian for "the pinniped waterfall"), meaning a waterfall where pinnipeds lived. It also has been connected with the Sami word saelhtie, meaning "ocean". This interpretation of "Sel-foss", however, is doubtful. In the old dialect of Rana they never used the name "sel" for pinnipeds, but rather used "købbe". Købbforsen which literally means "the pinniped waterfall", is located in another place in Rana Municipality. The name could also be seen in connection with sele ("silent flowing and deep water"), similar to the Swedish place names of Lycksele, Sorsele, and Åsele. Selfors may then mean "a waterfall in a river with silent flowing, deep water". The waterfall is located at Fossetangen, and the "silent flowing, deep water" might be to river Ranelva.

== Media gallery ==
=== Kvitbergan ===
Photos from the mountains around Selfors, taken in November 2005:

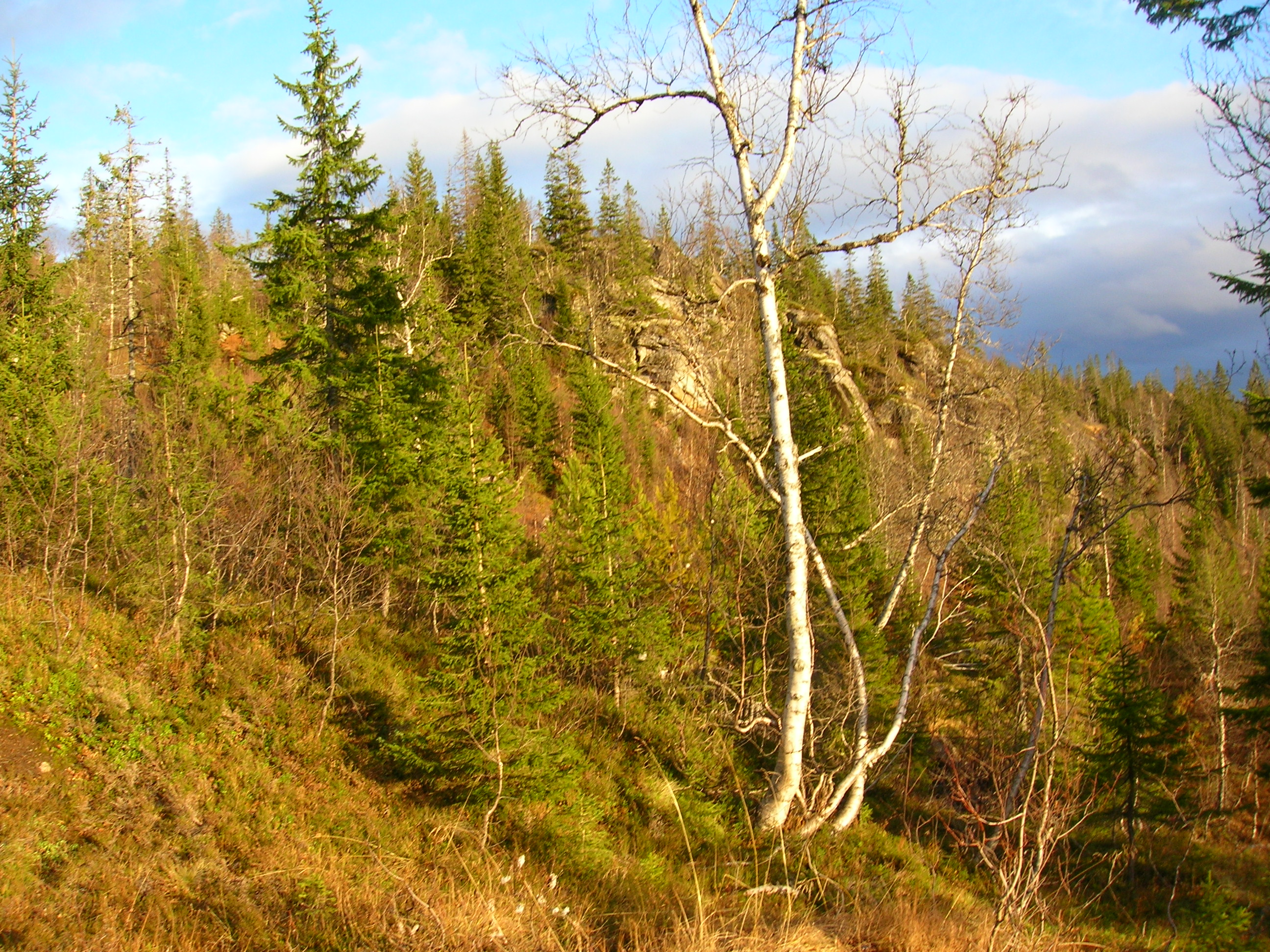
Kvitbergan

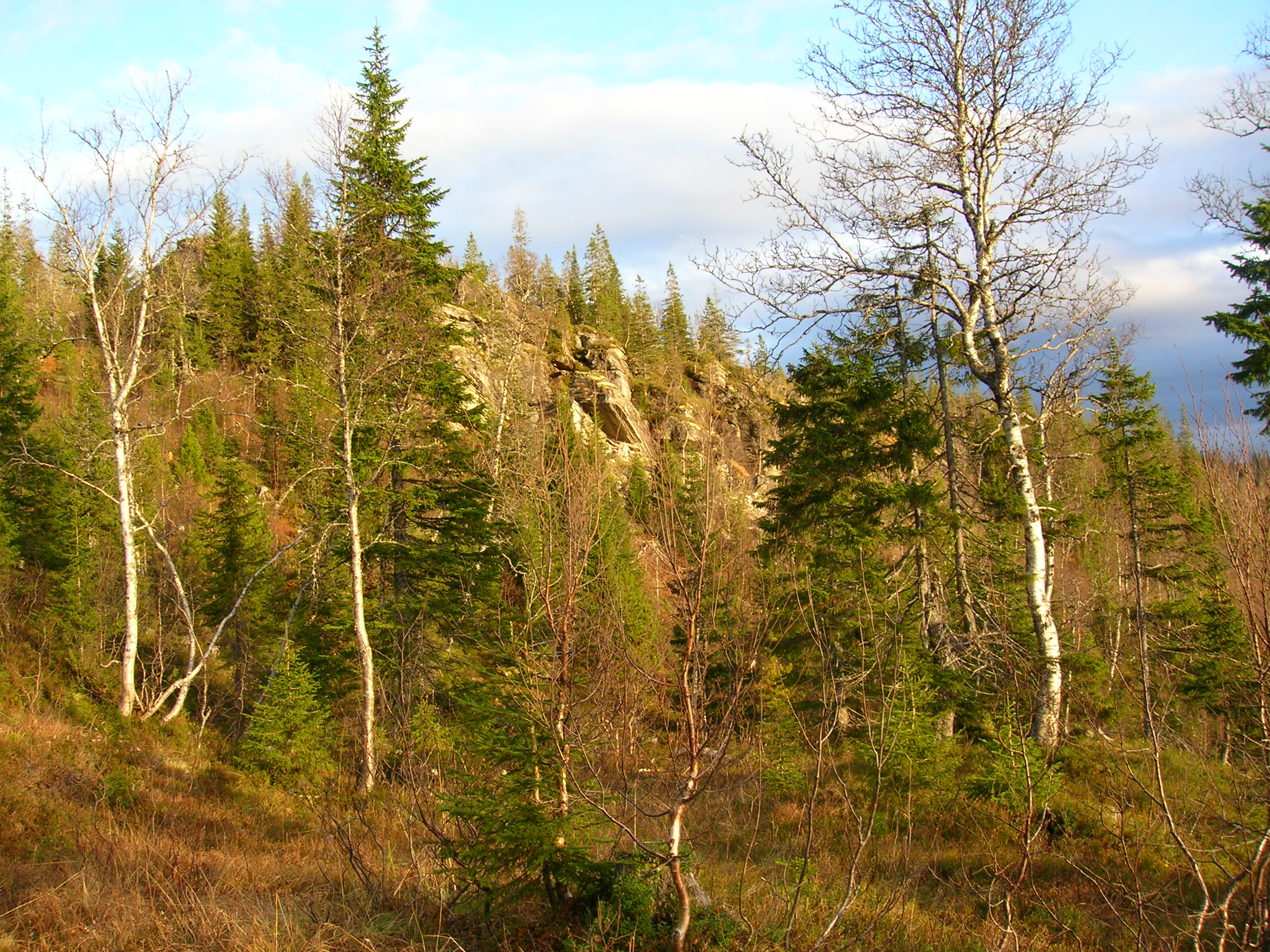
Kvitbergan

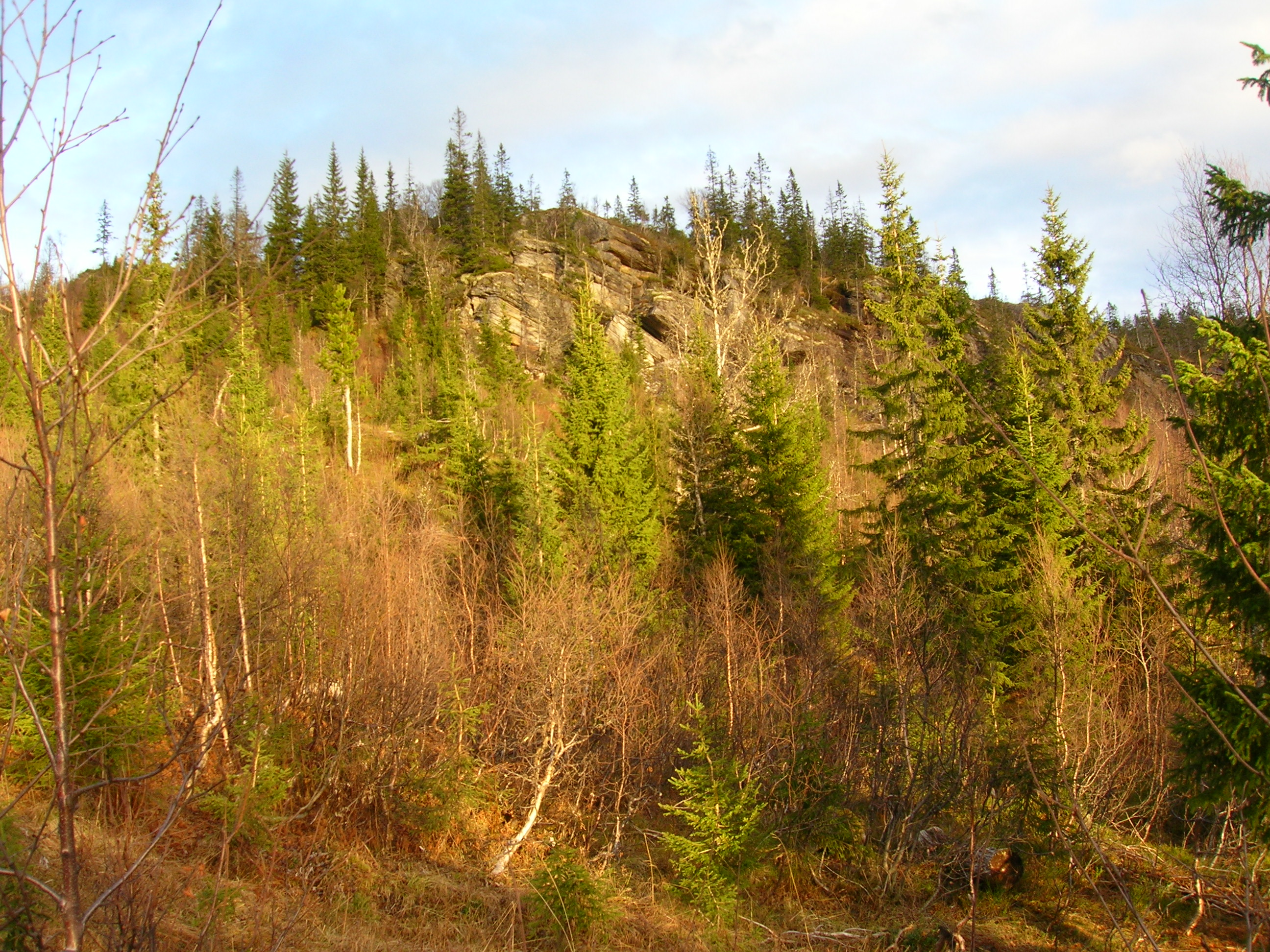
Kvitbergan

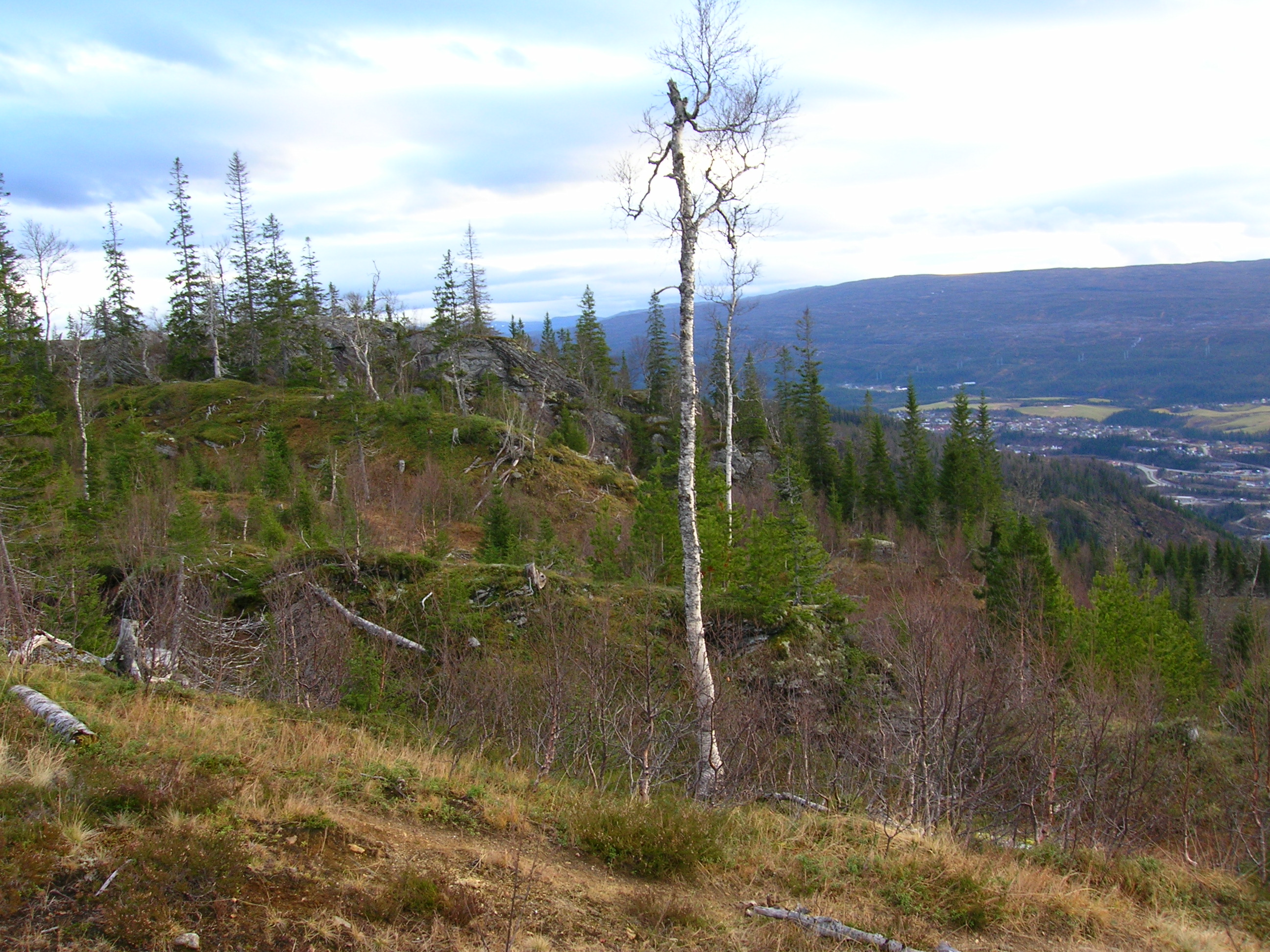
Gruben seen from Kvitbergan

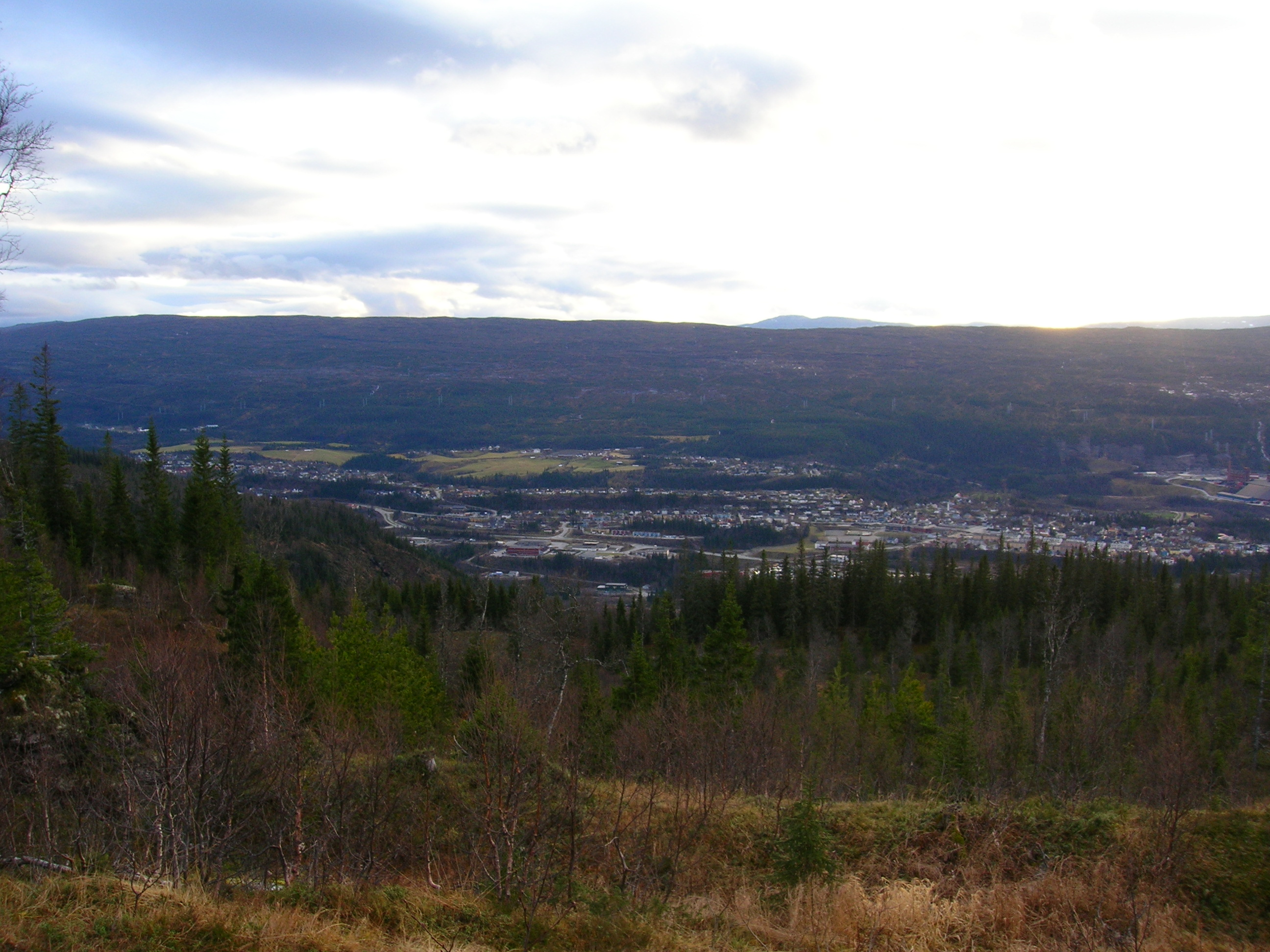
Gruben seen from Kvitbergan

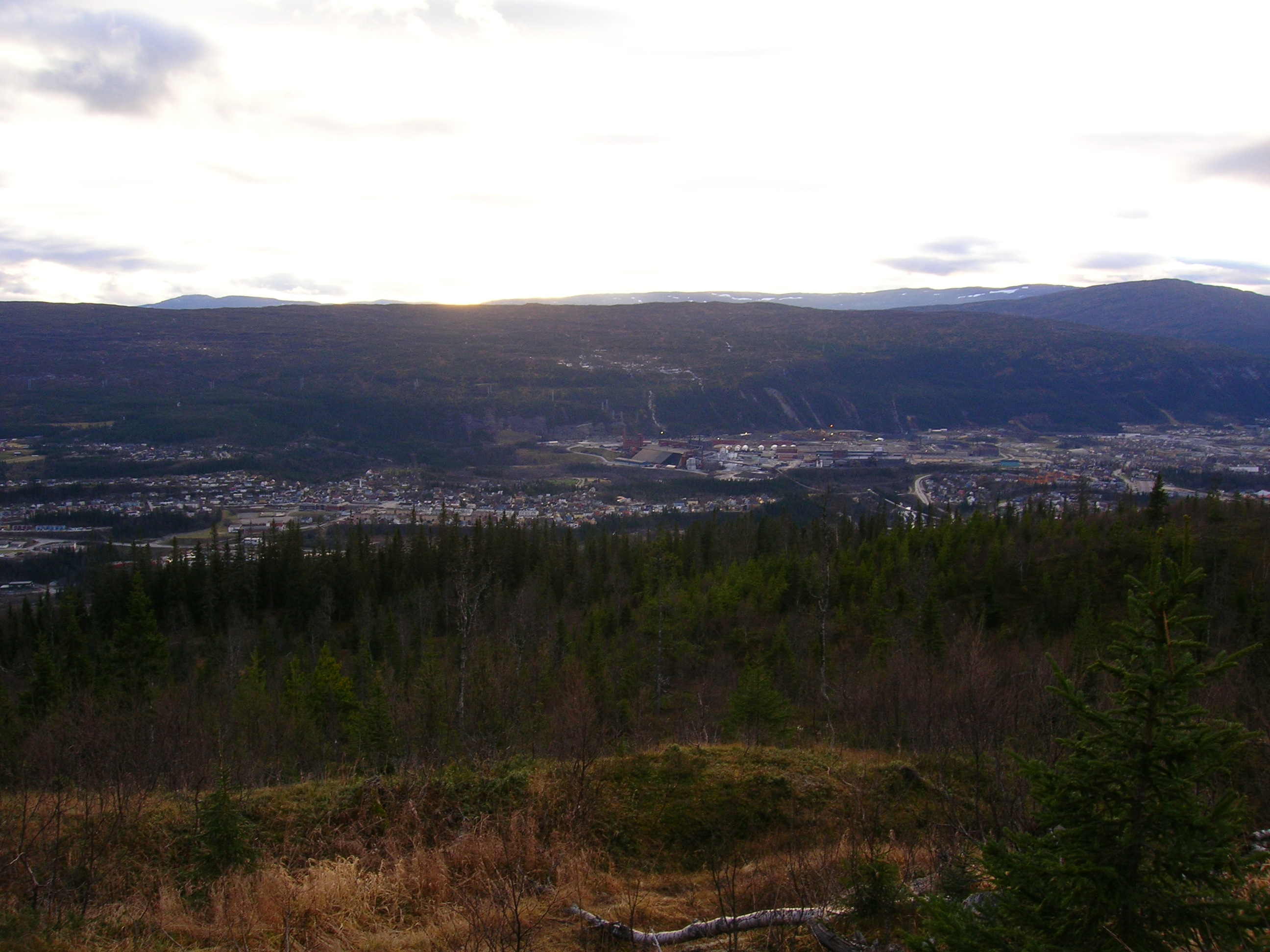
Mo i Rana seen from Kvitbergan

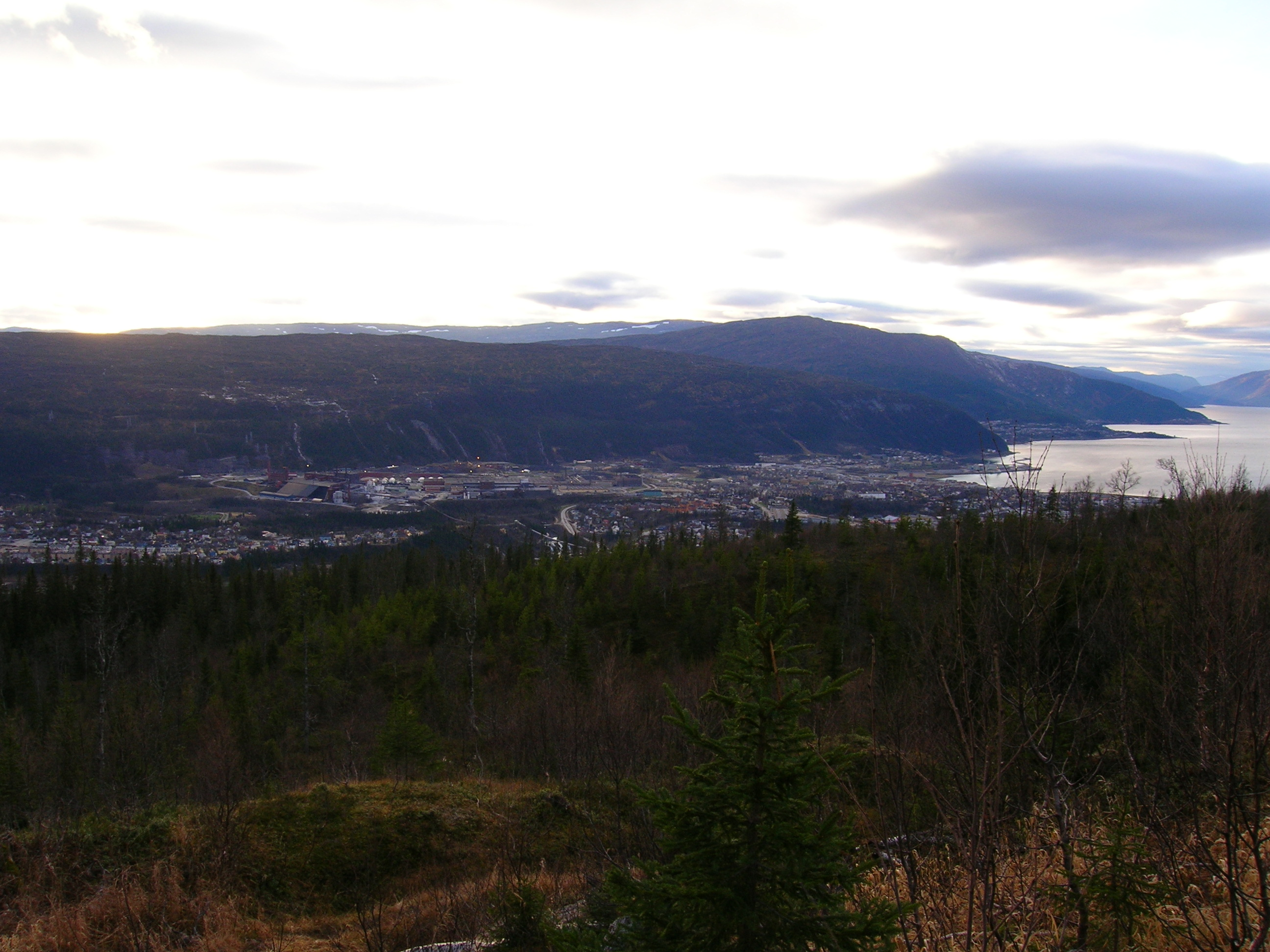
Mo i Rana seen from Kvitbergan

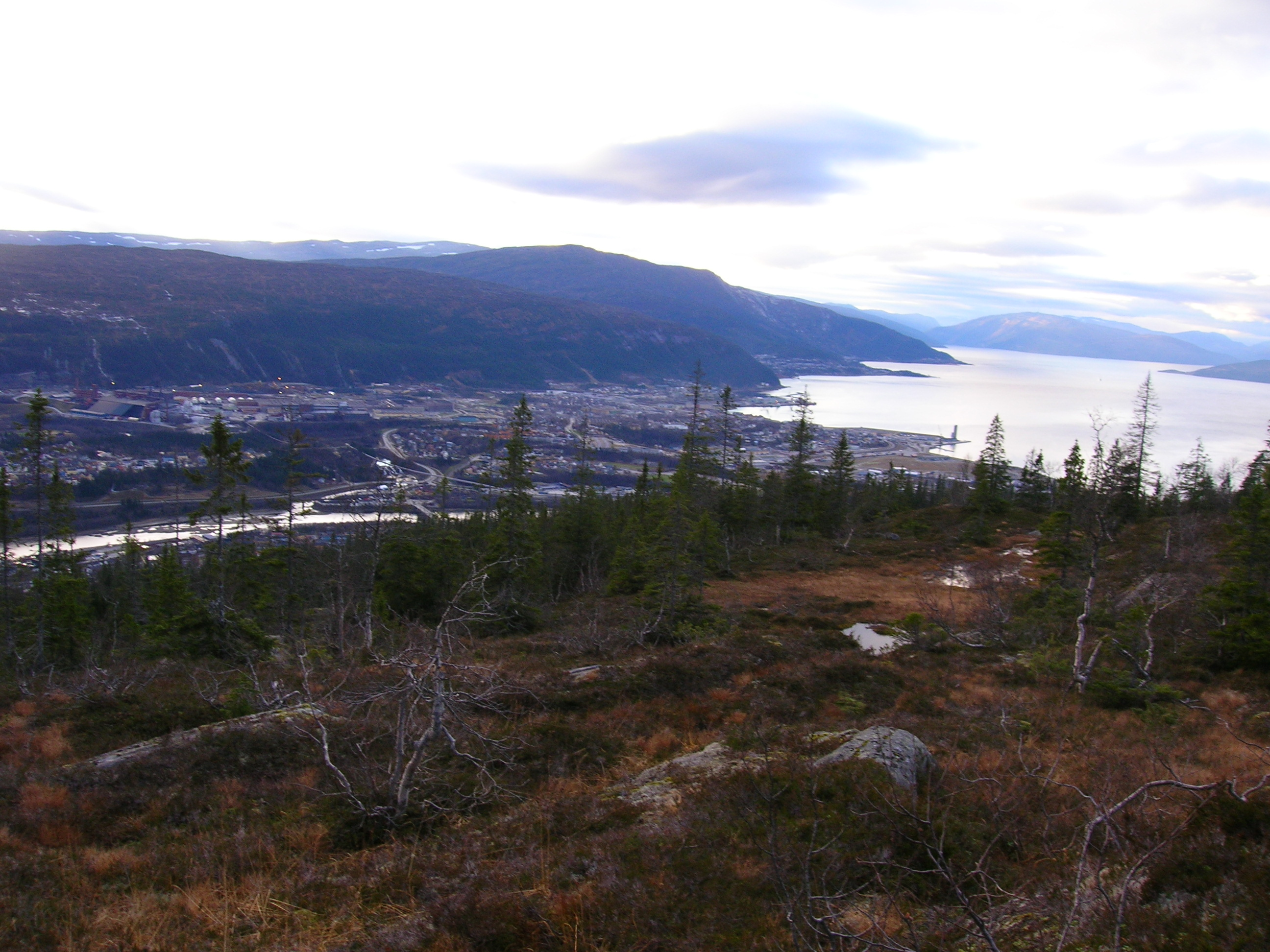

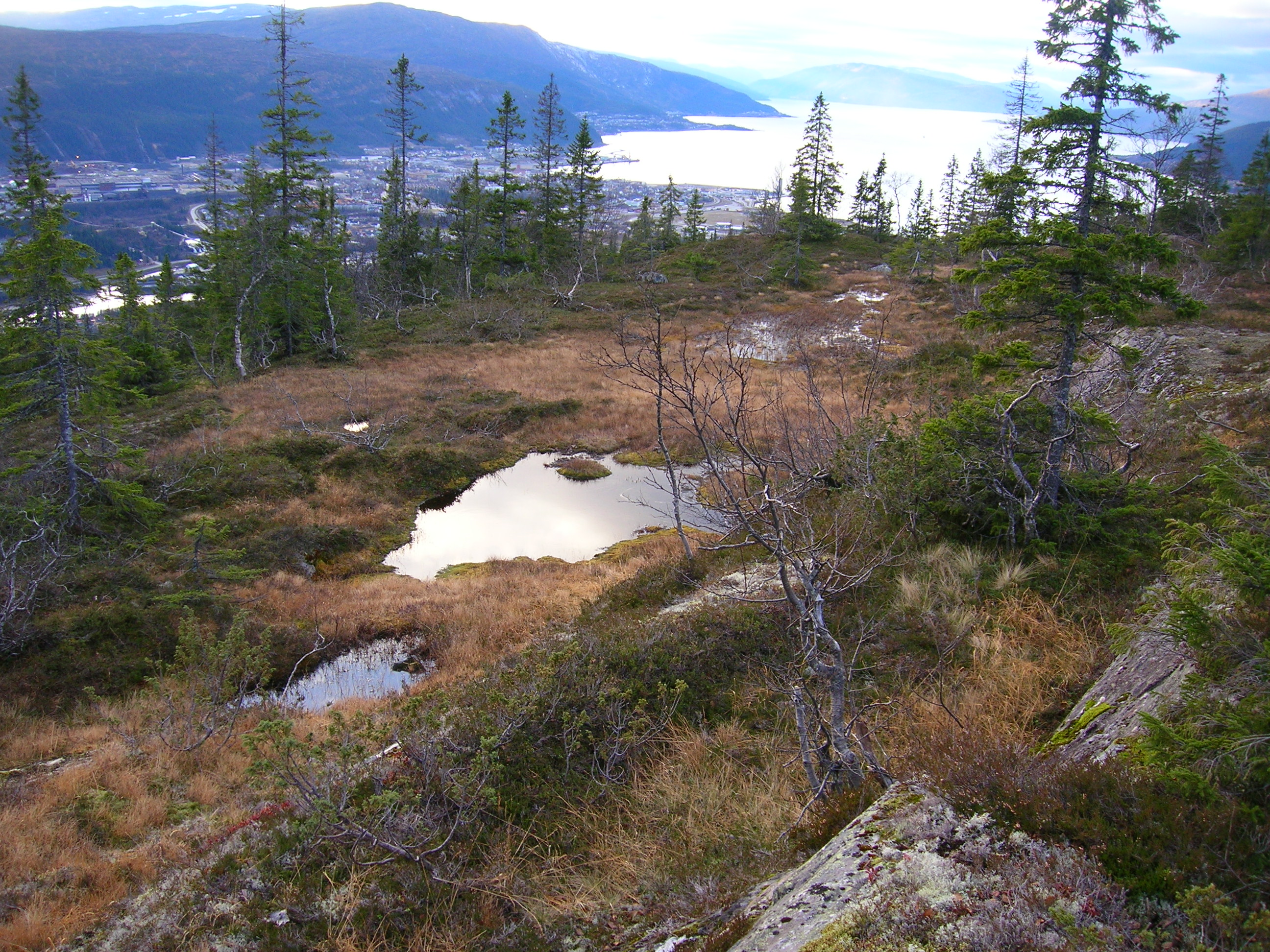

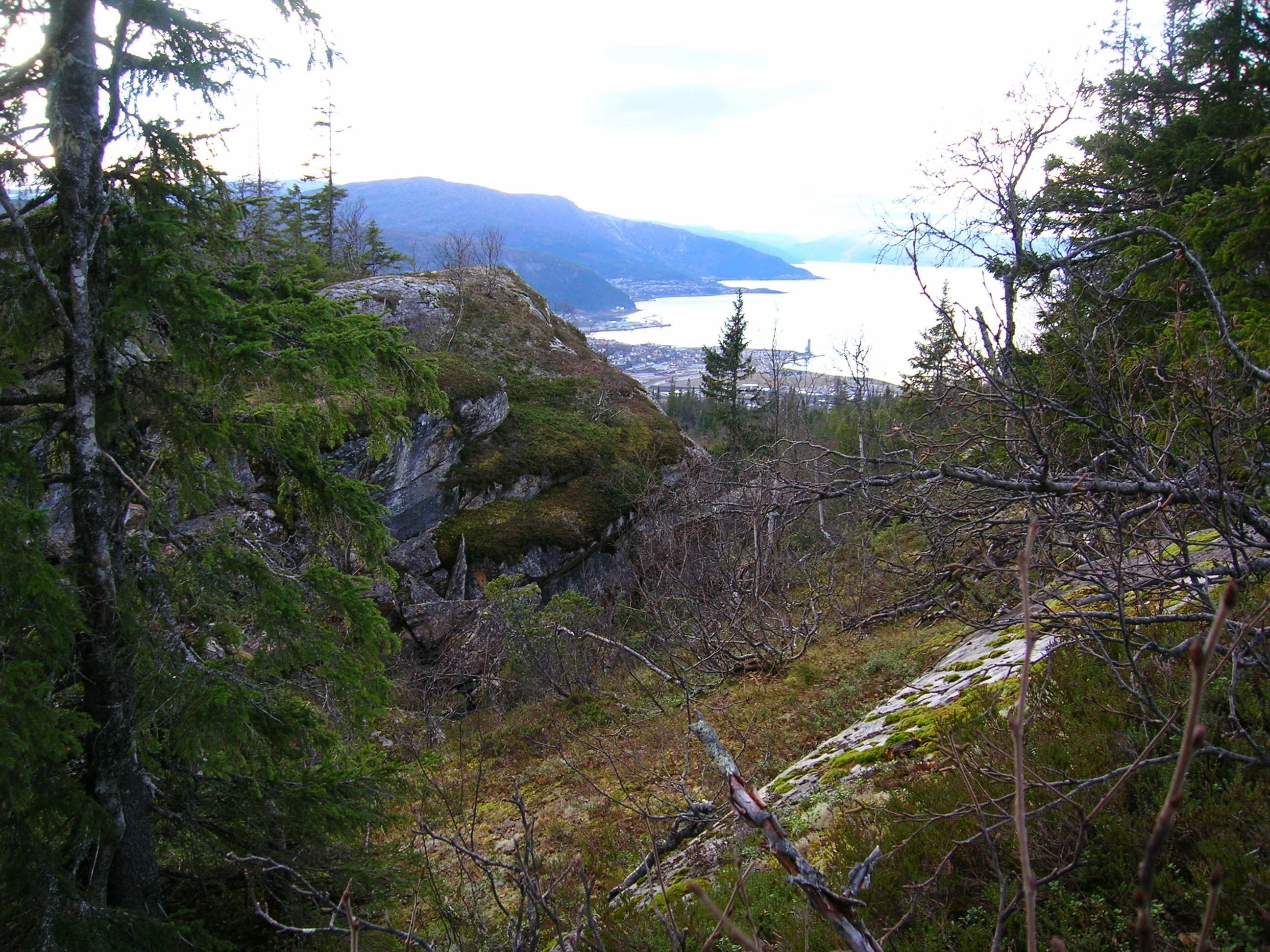

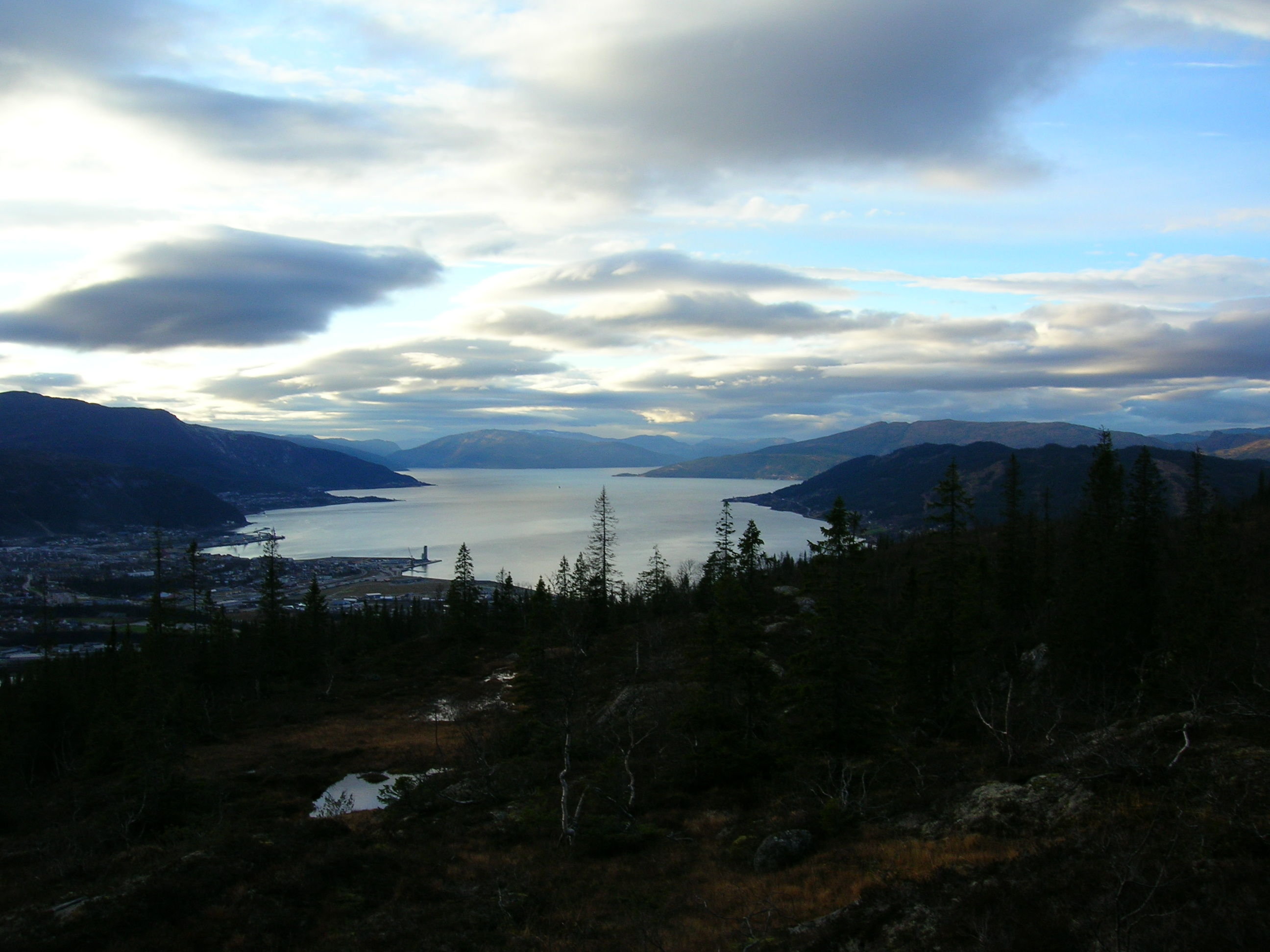

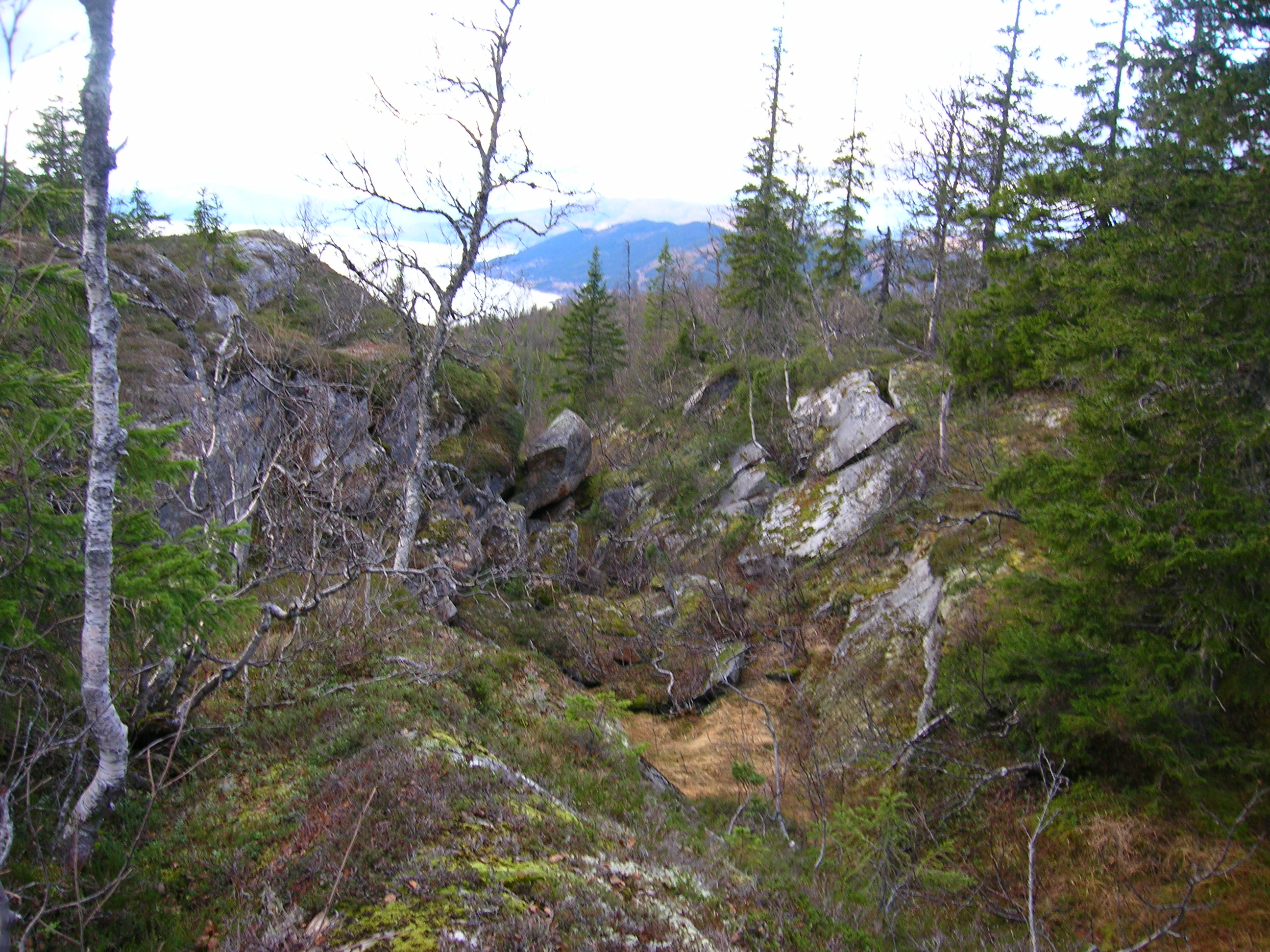

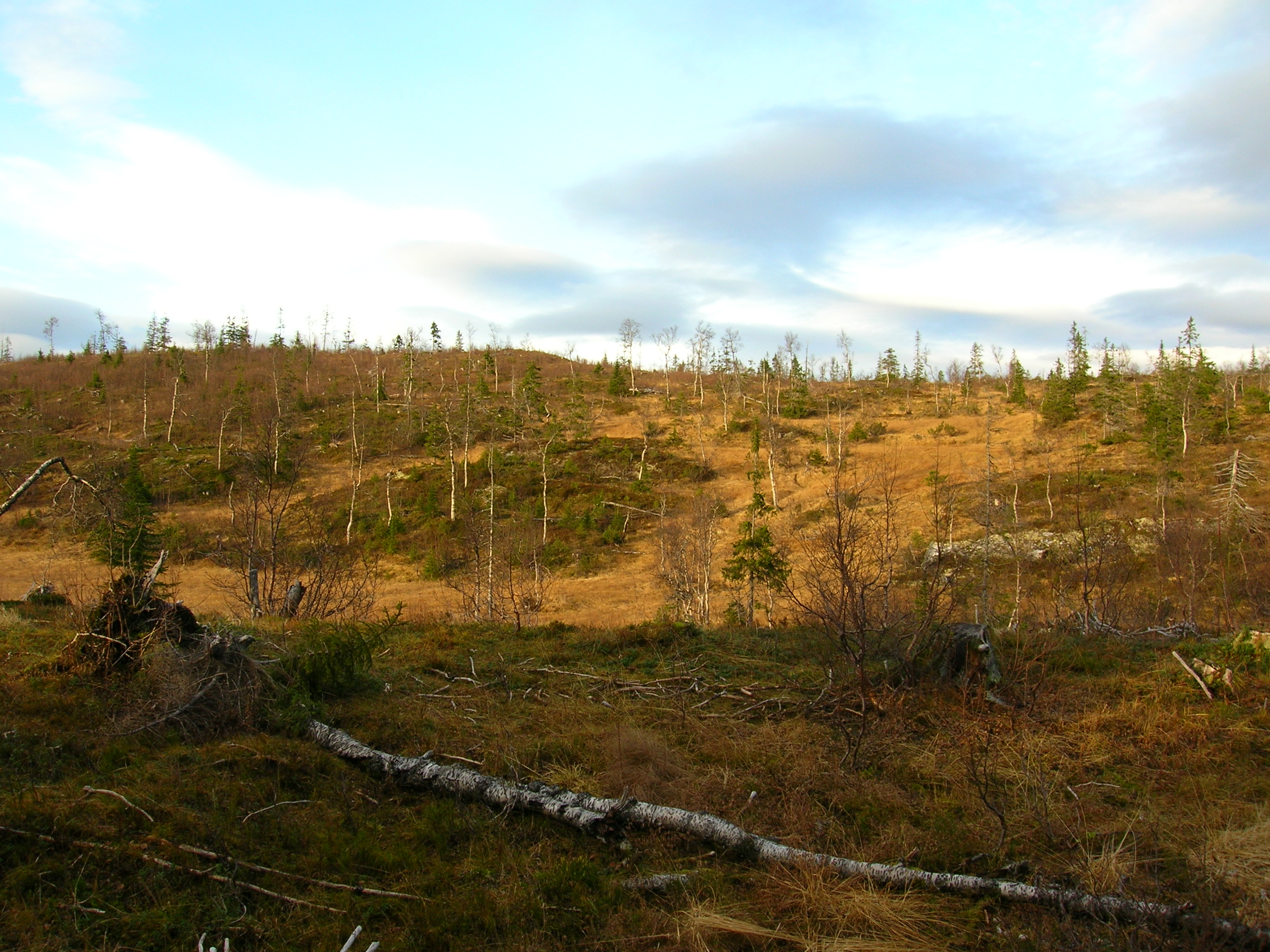
The wetland area towards Langvatnet

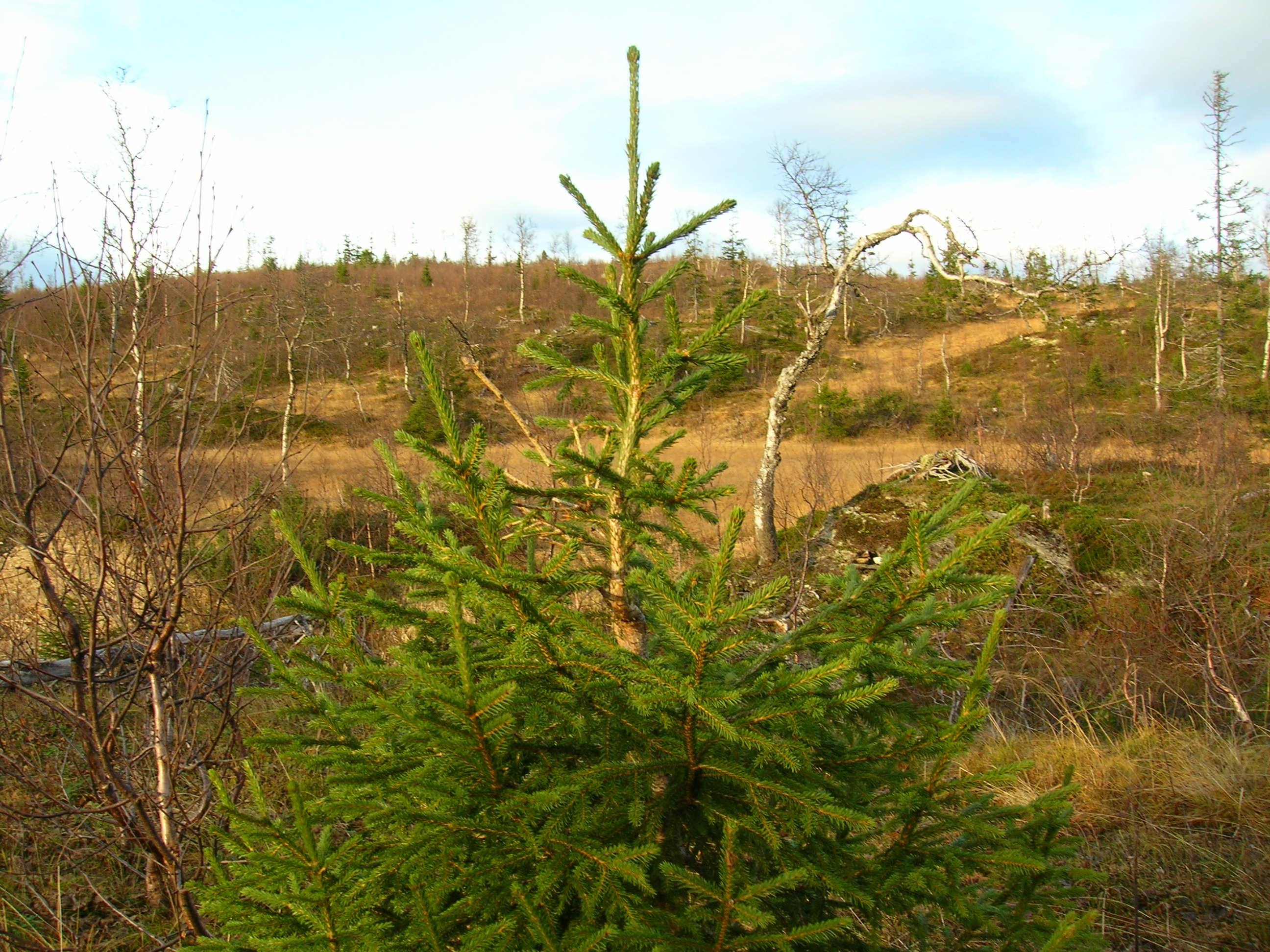
The wetland area towards Langvatnet
