= Selfors Church =

Church in Nordland, Norway

- Selfors kirke
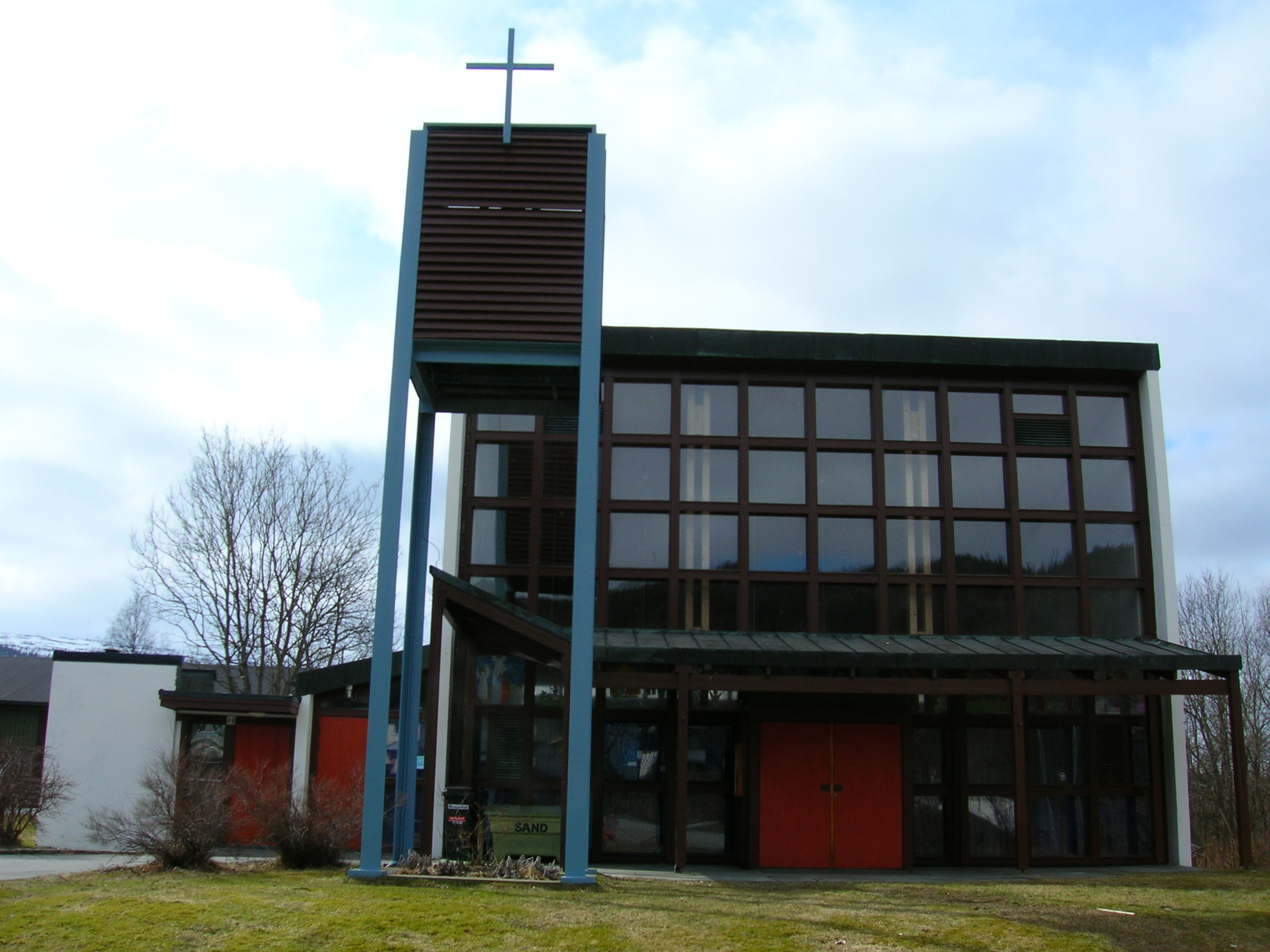
- View of the chapel
- Selfors Church
- 66.32499835°N 14.17032748°E
- Location: Rana Municipality, Nordland
- Country: Norway
- Denomination: Church of Norway
- Churchmanship: Evangelical Lutheran

History
- Status: Chapel
- Founded: 1976
- Consecrated: 1976

Architecture
- Functional status: Catholic church that is leased to the Church of Norway to use
- Completed: 1971 (55 years ago)

Specifications
- Capacity: 200
- Materials: Concrete, Wood, Glass

Administration
- Diocese: Sør-Hålogaland
- Deanery: Indre Helgeland prosti
- Parish: Nord-Rana

Selfors Church (Norwegian: Selfors kirke) is a rented chapel of the Church of Norway in Rana Municipality in Nordland county, Norway. It is located in the village of Selfors. It is an annex chapel for the Nord-Rana parish which is part of the Indre Helgeland prosti (deanery) in the Diocese of Sør-Hålogaland. The concrete, wood, and glass church was built in 1971 for the Catholic Church in Rana and has been leased by the Nord-Rana parish since 1976. The church seats about 200 people.

== Media gallery ==
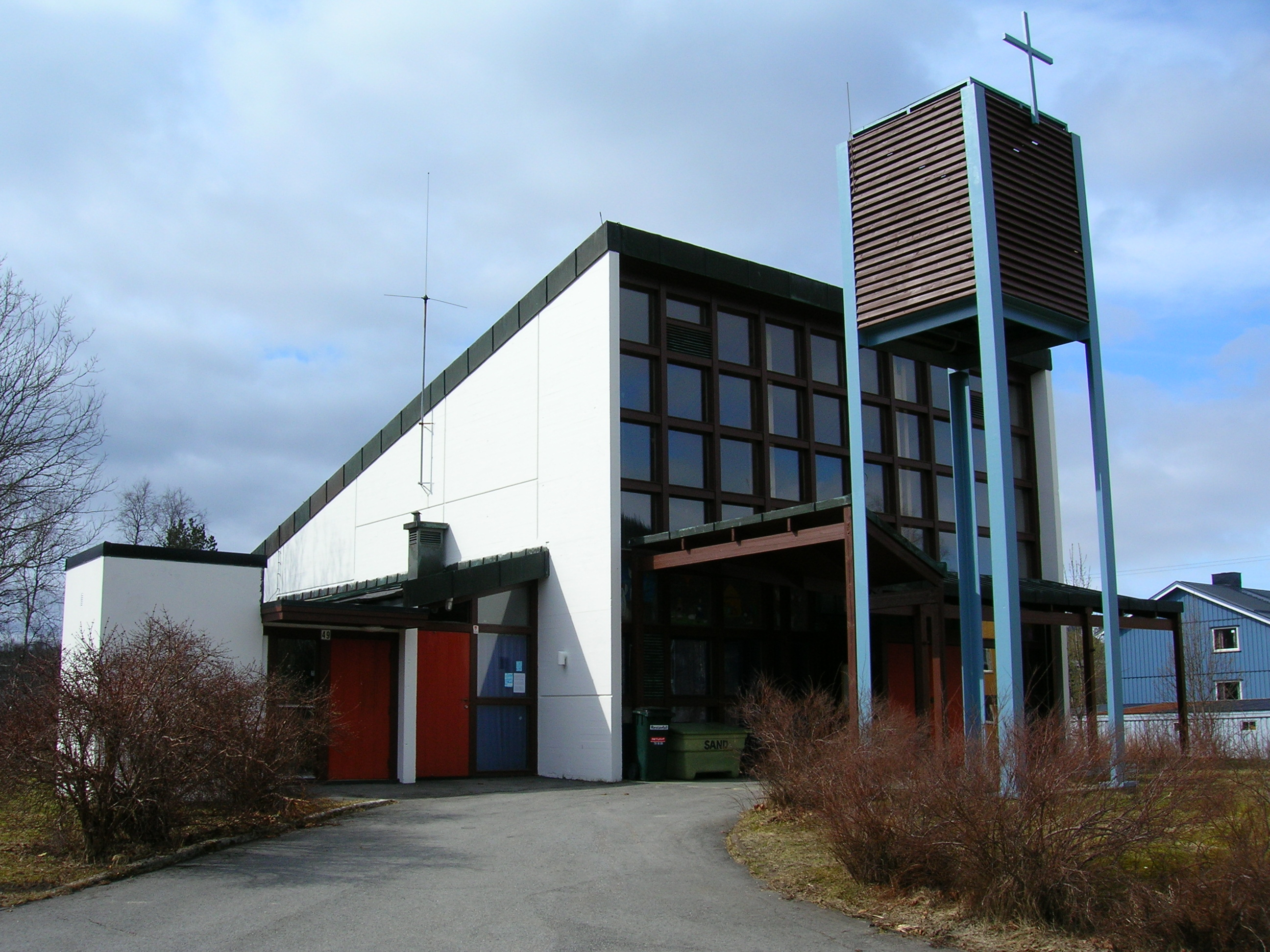

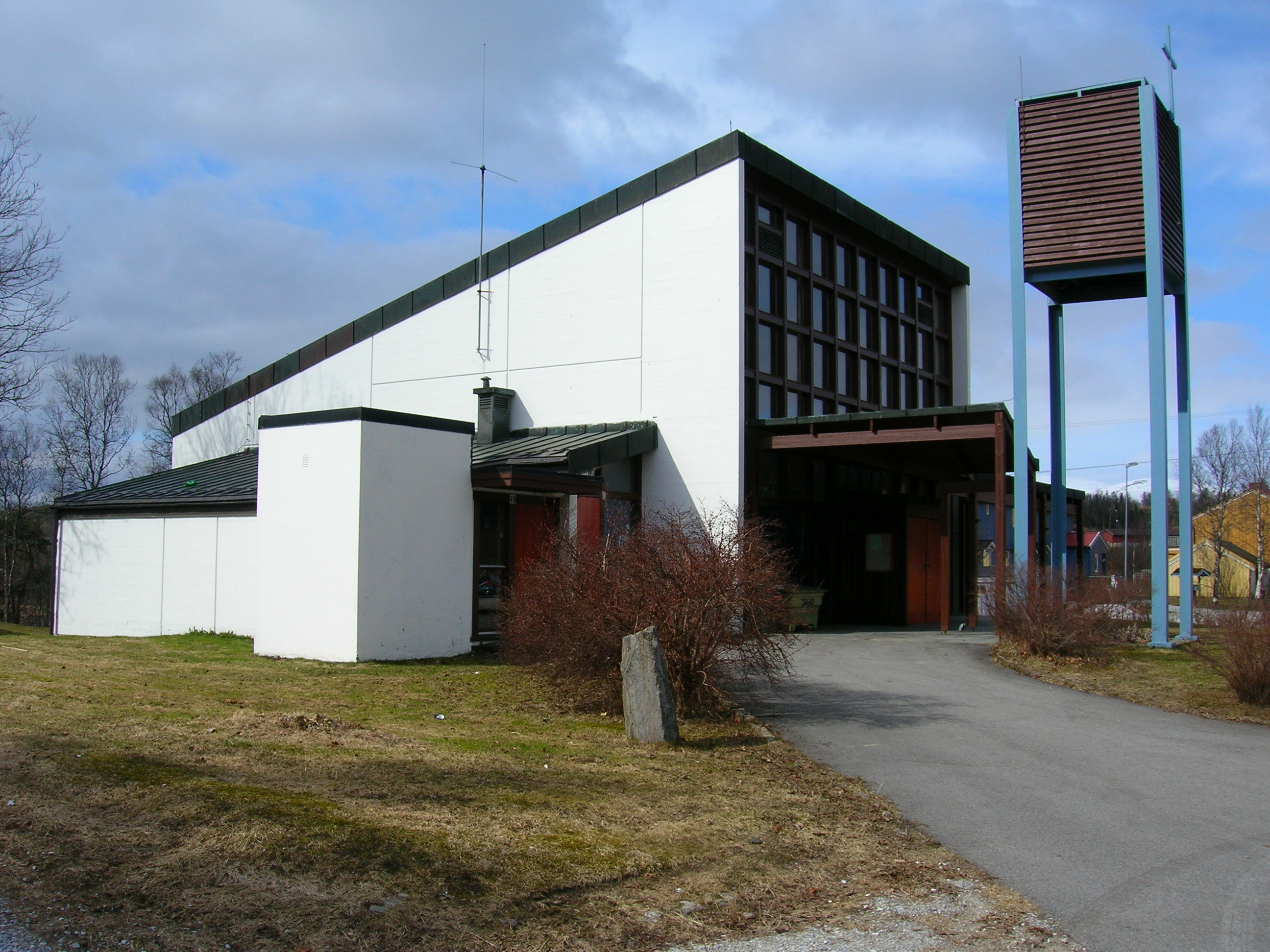

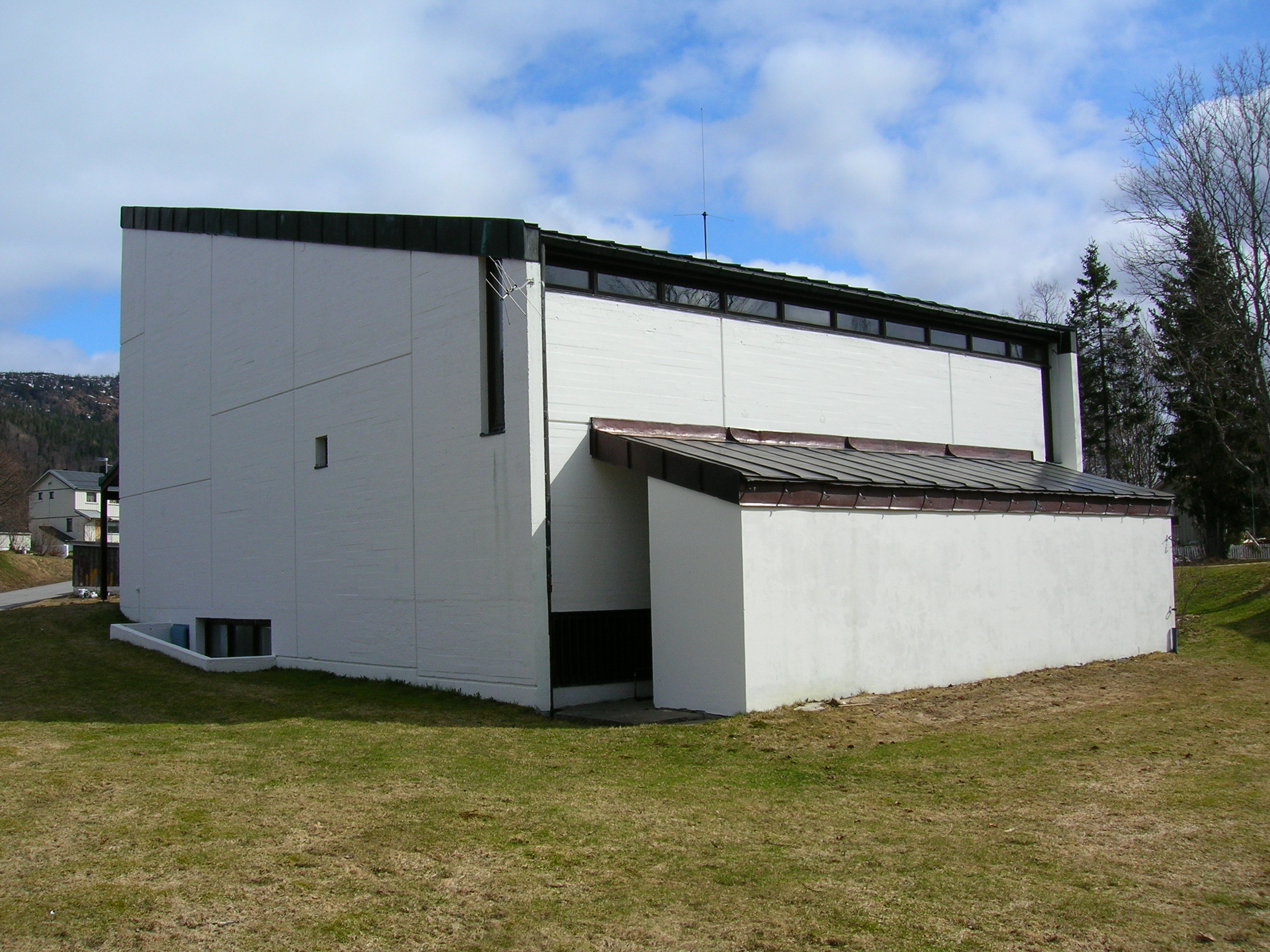

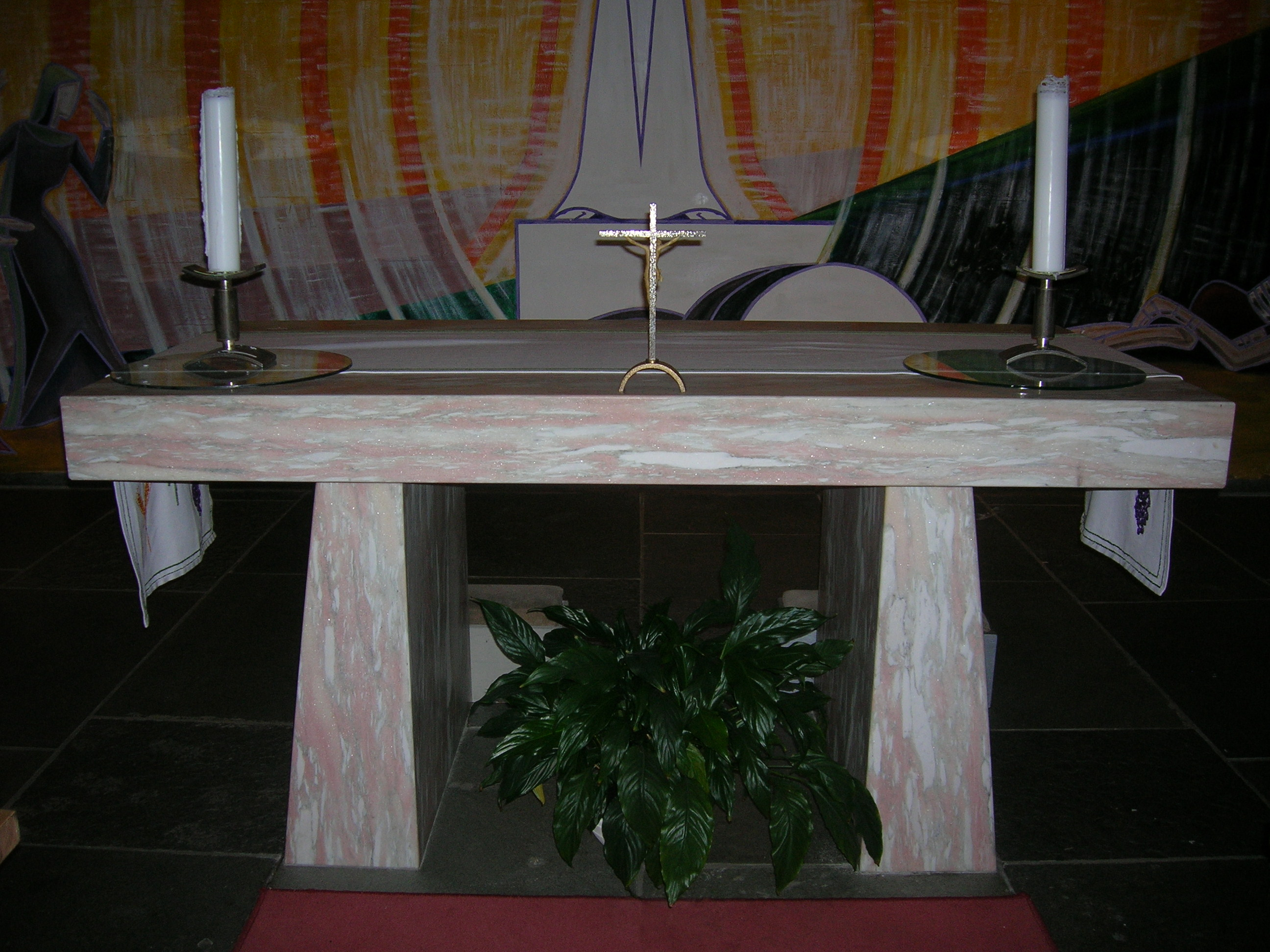

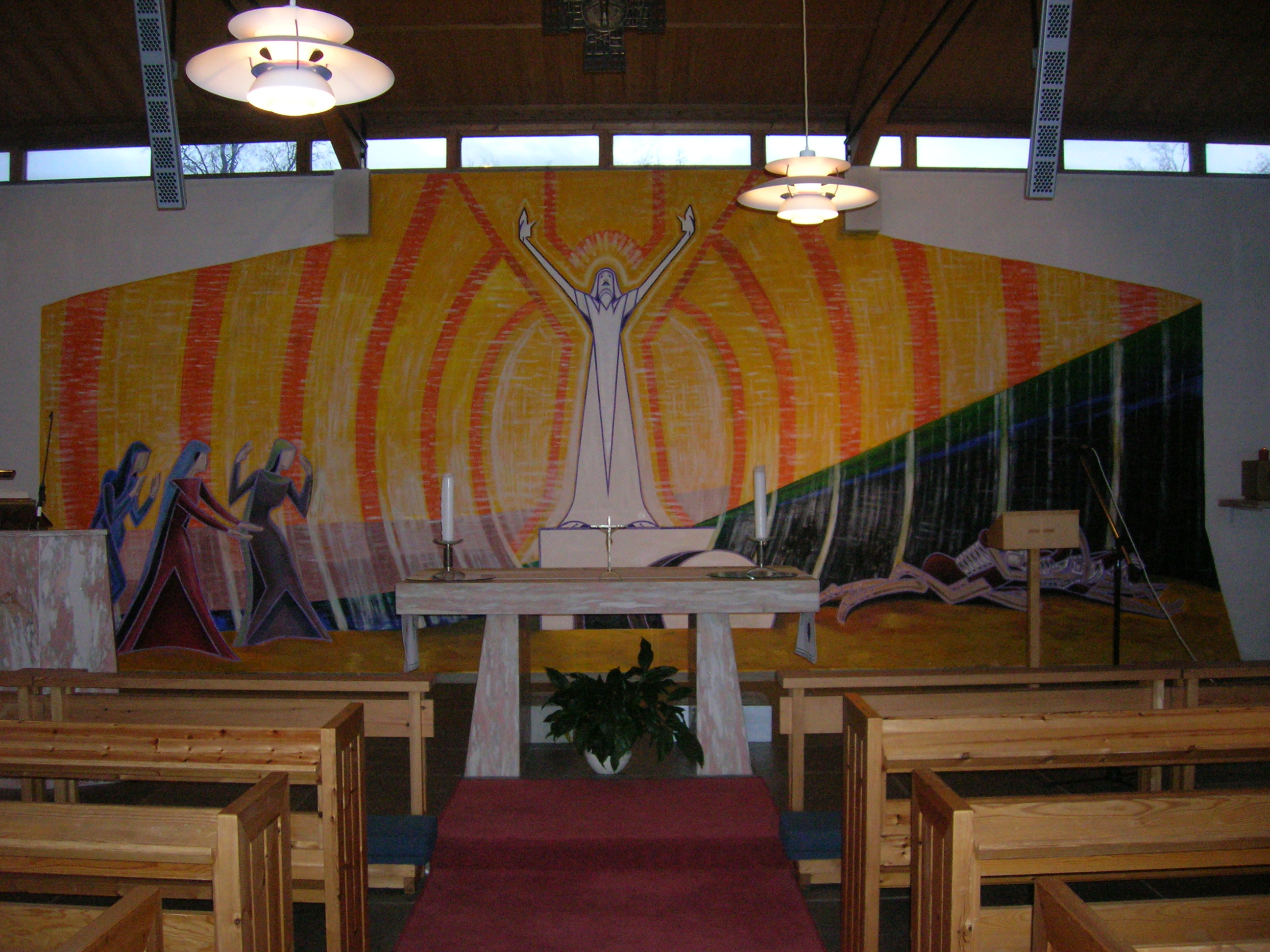

== See also ==
- List of churches in Sør-Hålogaland
