= Pluragrotta =

Flooded cave in Norway

Coordinates: 66°13′10″N 14°46′21″E

- Interactive map of Pluragrotta
- Location: Rana Municipality, Norway
- Depth: at least 135 metres (443 ft)
- Length: approximately 3,000 metres (9,800 ft)
- Discovery: first dive 1980
- Geology: Limestone and marble
- Entrances: 2
- Hazards: Narrow passages, cold water
- Access: Plura and Steinugleflåget

Pluragrotta is a cave in Rana Municipality in Nordland county, Norway. It is the deepest cave in Northern Europe. Most caves in Rana, of which there are some 200, are not suitable for diving.

A popular cave diving destination, Pluragrotta attracts more divers than any other cave in Scandinavia. Visibility in the cave waters is high. The water is close to freezing, around 2 °C (36 °F). The first 450 metres (1,480 ft) of the cave, down to about 33 metres (108 ft), lead to an air-filled chamber known as the Wedding Chamber. The cave's passages were formed by the flow of the Plura river over limestone, and the cave system includes marble formations. A number of species have been identified in the cave ecosystem.

Diving became possible in Pluragrotta with the damming of lake Kallvatnet in the 1960s. There have been multiple injuries and fatalities among cave divers at the site, which is accessible year-round.

== Discovery and exploration ==
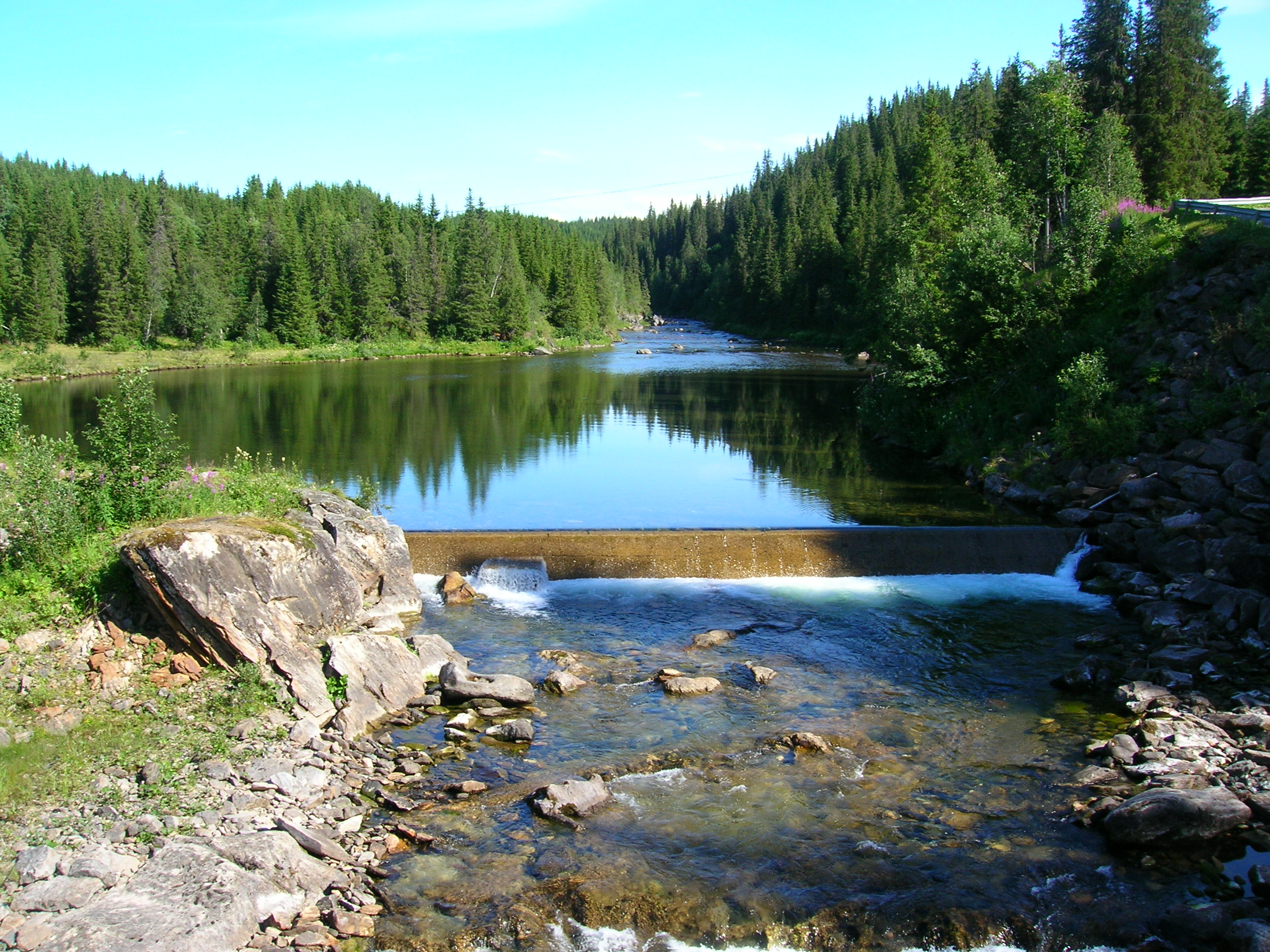
Lake Kallvatnet dam reduced flow in the River Plura through Plurdalen valley, opening the cave up to divers.

The damming of lake Kallvatnet in the mid-1960s greatly reduced water flow in the partially subterranean Plura river, making diving possible in the cave.

The first known dive in Pluragrotta was done by Svein Grundstrøm and Bjørn Fagertun in 1980. They are believed to have dived to 135 metres.

In 1987 a group of ten Norwegian divers started to explore the Pluragrotta's underwater cave system. Most of the divers were working as Fire brigade-officers in Oslo brannvesen and they did the exploration on their own time without sponsors. By 1997 they had surveyed large parts of almost three kilometers of the subterranean water-filled caves. Their work became known when NRK in 1997 aired a program about it in the series Ut i naturen (Out into the Nature) when seven members of Norsk teknisk dykkekrets presented the Pluragrotta on TV. They had the cooperation of S. E. Lauritzen at the University of Bergen who at the time was the only one in Norway doing professional research on the caves.

Exploration has been undertaken by two Norwegian diving organizations, with Norsk Teknisk Dykkekrets doing much of the early surveying and Reel Action Diving continuing the work since 2002. The cave has attracted Finnish divers in recent years, with rivalry developing between Finnish and Norwegian teams. Finnish explorers were the first to discover a connection between the two known entrances: Pluragrotta, and the nearby dry cave Steinugleflåget, in September 2013.

Exploration is complicated by the cold water and narrow passages of the underwater cave system, and divers can get lost in its side passages. The connection between Pluragrotta and Steinugleflåget caves remained undiscovered for decades, in part because of the difficult access route to the dry cave, Steinugleflåget. Reaching its head pool requires a vertical dry-cave climb of over 330 feet (100 m).

Visibility in the cave's waters is considered extremely good, with divers able to see up to 66 feet (20 m). An added attraction of the cave is its accessibility in all seasons.

== Geology ==
The cave system, with its marble formations, lies beneath the Scandinavian Mountains. It was formed by the flow of the river Plura across porous limestone. Sediments, boulders and sands in the cave appear to be periglacial or subglacial in origin.

A similar diveable cave nearby is Litjåga. Of some 200 caves in Rana, however, most are not suitable for diving, and cave formation has been limited owing to a predominance of granite in the region's geology.

== Fauna ==
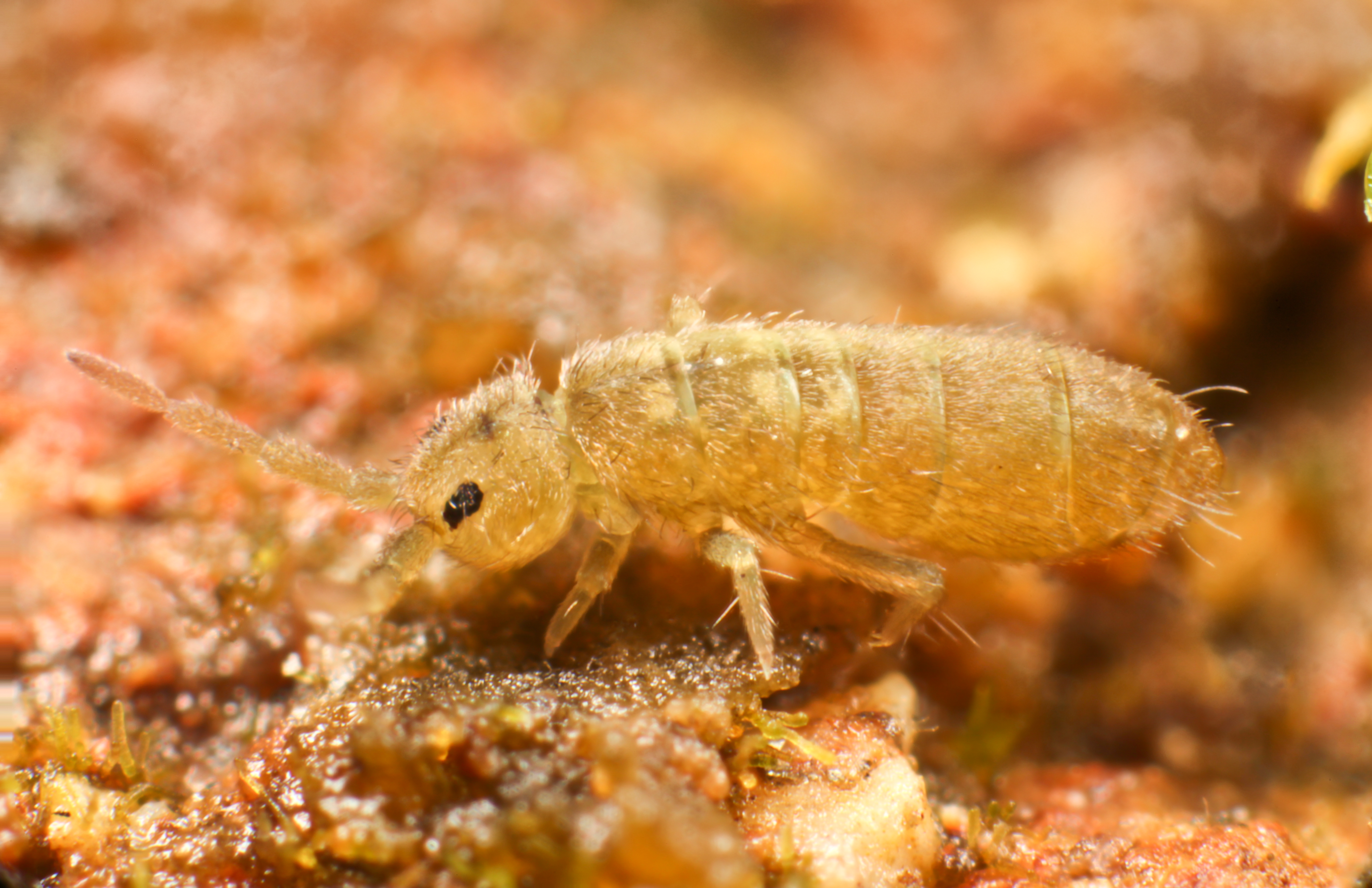
Desoria olivacea

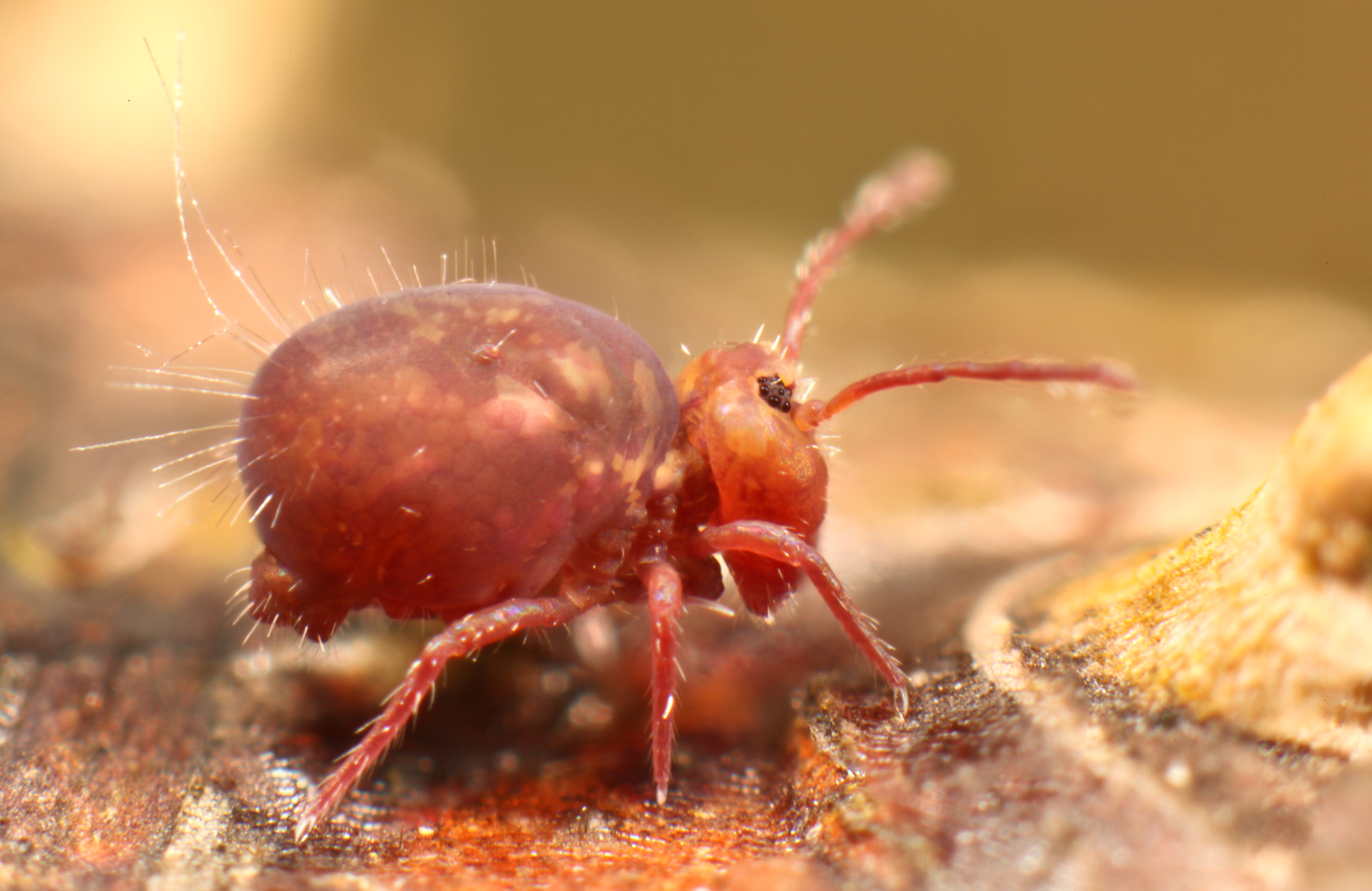
Dicyrtoma fusca

Although the harsh Norwegian climate limits the diversity of cave-dwelling species in comparison with Southern European caves, several invertebrate species have been identified in Jordbruggrotta.

No fish are believed to live in the cave. Footage from the 2016 documentary Diving into the Unknown, however, clearly shows a fish in one scene.

Species living in the cave include:

- Arpedium quadrum
- Belba spp.
- Chamobates cuspidatus
- Desoria olivacea
- Dicyrtoma fusca
- Leptus spp.
- Liogluta alpestris
- Oxypoda spectabilis
- Porrhomma convexum
- Psephidonus longipes
- Siphonoperla burmeisteri

== World record ==
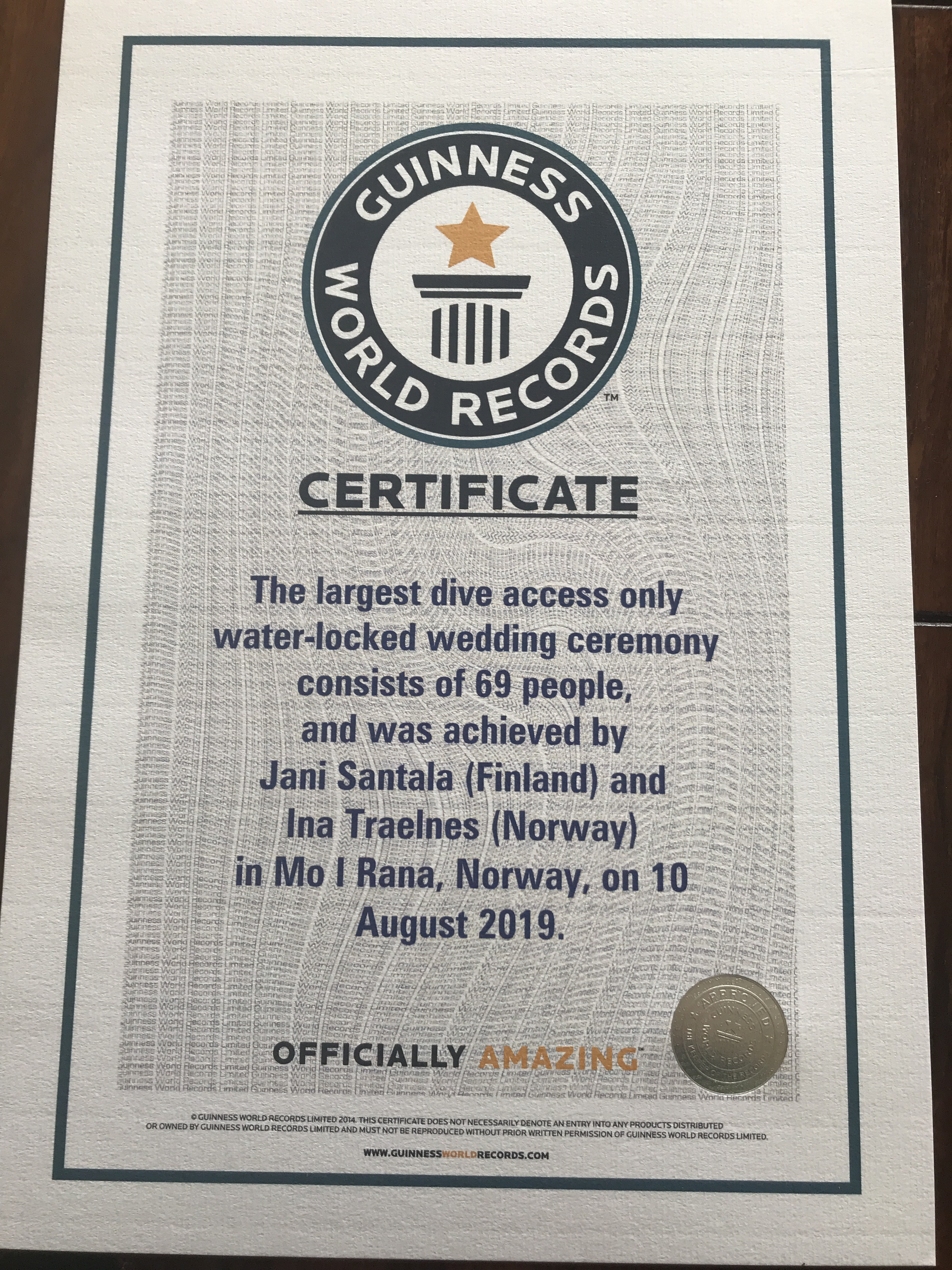
Official World Record recognized by Guinness World Records

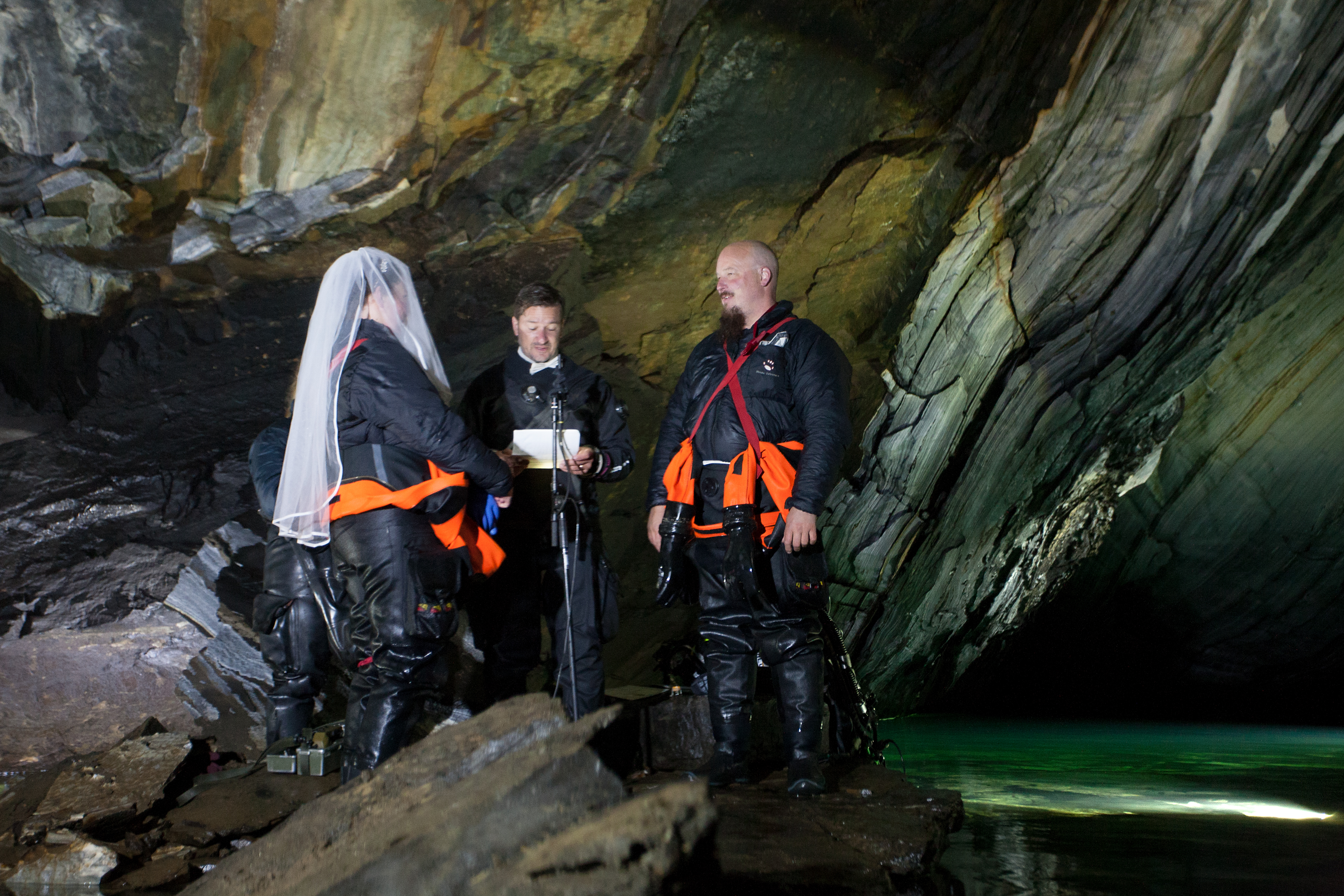
The wedding

On 10 August 2019, a wedding in Pluragrotta achieved a Guinness World Record as "The largest dive access only water-locked wedding ceremony". 69 persons participated and the couple to achieve the record was Jani Santala (Finland) and Ina Trælnes (Norway). The wedding was shown on the TV2 News and streamed live on YouTube.

== Diving accidents ==
Given the number of divers in the cave, accidents have been relatively infrequent at Pluragrotta. There have, however, been a number of injuries and deaths.

In August 1988, a diver exploring the cave tore the right leg of his diving suit on a sharp rock. He survived the incident, suffering only mild hypothermia.

On 16 August 2006, a Norwegian diver was reported missing. A team of British divers recovered his body on 28 August 2006.

On 6 February 2014, two Finnish divers died at the cave, and three other divers suffered decompression sickness. Norwegian authorities called on an international team, which included British divers Richard Stanton, John Volanthen and Jason Mallinson, to recover the bodies. After reconnaissance diving at the site, the operation was judged too difficult, and a diving ban was subsequently placed on the cave. A group of Finnish divers returned later, without official authorization, and recovered the bodies. Their recovery expedition was filmed as the documentary Diving Into The Unknown. The diving ban was lifted on 31 March 2014.

On 3 April 2024, a US diver, Jared Hires, died in the cave as a result of a seizure. A preliminary analysis by Divers Alert Network found that the dive computer data did not support an oxygen-induced seizure and pointed to an underlying medical cause.

== See also ==
- Tjoarvekrajgge – the longest cave in Scandinavia
- Jordbrugrotta – Cave system in Norway

== Further media ==
- Juan Reina (2016). Takaisin pintaan [Diving into the Unknown] (in Finnish). Monami Agency Oy.
- Taija Nevalainen (25 August 2012). "Plura Cave Deep Exploration 2012, depth 132m".
- William Kremer (9 May 2016). "The cave divers who went back for their friends". BBC News.
- "Sukellusryhmä: Ruumiiden nosto kuvattiin, 110 tuntia sukellusta". MTV3 (in Finnish and English). 28 March 2014.
- Lars Christian Wegner. "VG takes you through dramatic diving death in the Plura cave and the following rescue operation".
- Petri Raivio; Paula Tapiola (27 March 2014). "Suomalaiset sukeltajat hakivat kuolleet kaverinsa ylös Norjassa".
- Fauna Norvegica. Norsk Zoologisk Tidsskriftsentral. 1984.
- D. Tarling; F. Hrouda (31 May 1993). Magnetic Anisotropy of Rocks. Springer Science & Business Media. p. 103. ISBN 978-0-412-49880-0.
- Monica Bring Estensen; Fredrik Svendsen (27 March 2014). "Omkomne dykkere hentet opp fra Pluragrotta".
