= Jordbrugrotta =

Cave system in Norway

Coordinates: 66.248944°N 14.734200°E

Jordbrugrotta is a cave in the upper parts of Plurdalen by the river in Rana Municipality in Nordland county in Norway. The cave is named after the farm Jordbrua further down the valley. The cave is situated about two kilometers south of the dam at Kallvatnet.

Jordbrugrotta was discovered during the Second World War. In 1949 an attempt to enter via Sprutfossen and into the main system did not succeed. In 1953 Jakob Otnes from NVE described parts of the cave and reported that during the winter they had succeeded in entering 500 meters into the mountain via Sprutfossen. In 1959 an expedition from NTH visited the cave but did not make a report.

In 1962 and 1964 the British cave club "Explorer's club" from Haberdasher's Aske's Hatcham School explored Jordbrugrotta. The cave has at least three entrances. One of the entrances is a bit north of Sprutbekken and it is possible to enter while the waterfall of Sprutfossen is small. Another entrance is called Hatcham Hole and enters from west to east. The tunnels in Jordbrugrotta have large dimensions and there are several cliffs of 15–20 meters where rope ladders are needed. There is a lot of water in the cave and a rubber boat is required several places in addition to the water almost reaching the roof in some places. The cave also contains several giant's kettles and most of them are half filled with water, but not deeper than can be waded to the thighs.

== In Beiarn ==
There is also a cave called Jordbrugrotta in Gråtådalen in Beiarn Municipality. This cave is situated between Uglefjell and Tiurdal and was made by the river Lissgråtåga, where the river has made a kettle about 300 meters by 150 meters and after that forced a corridor into the mountain which at a distance can remind one of a smaller railway hall.

== See also ==
- Pluragrotta – Flooded cave in Norway
