= Plura (river) =

River in Nordland, Norway

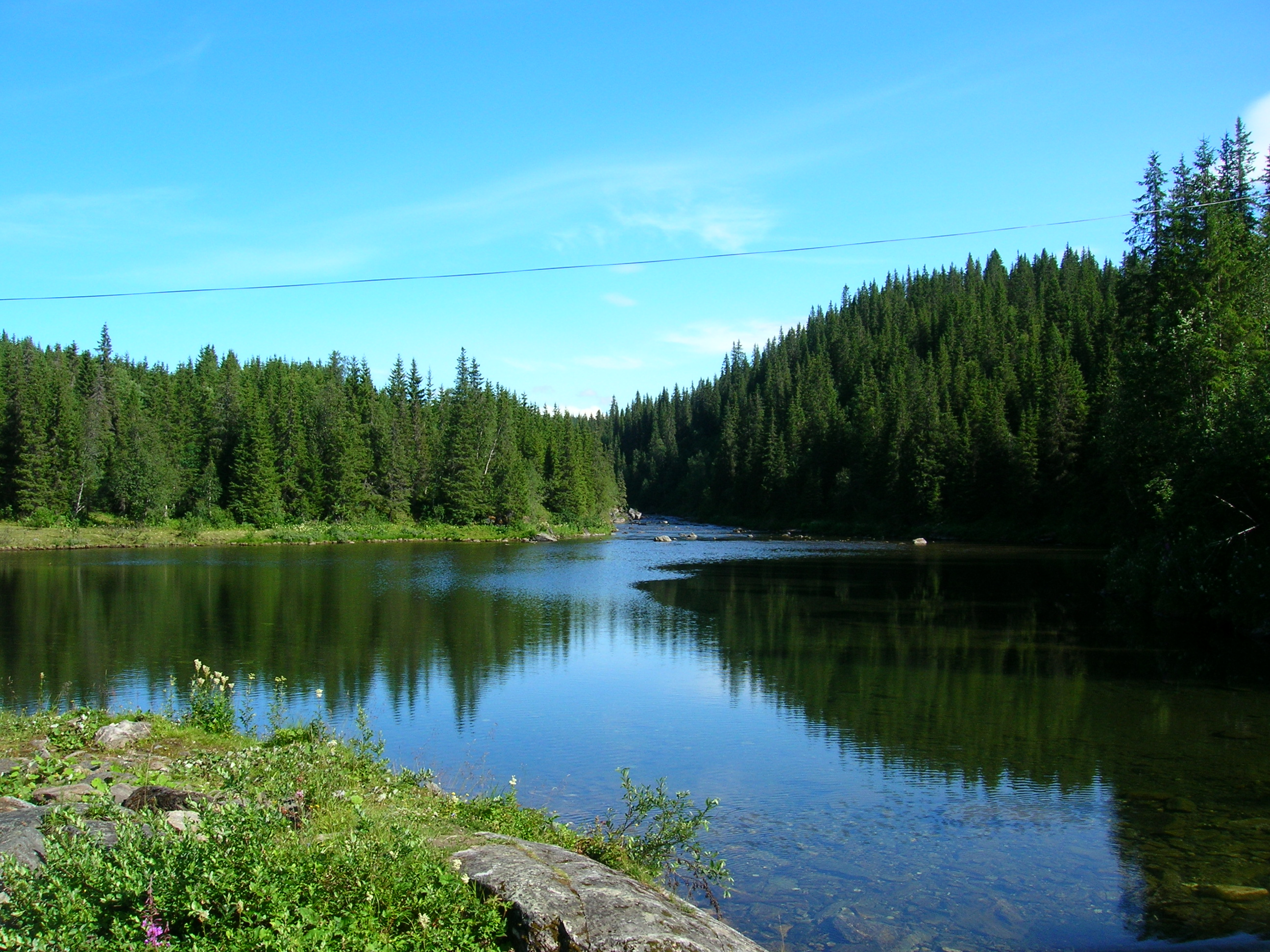
- Interactive map of the river

Location
- Country: Norway
- County: Nordland
- Municipalities: Rana Municipality

Physical characteristics
- Source: Kallvatnet
  - location: Rana Municipality, Norway
  - coordinates: 66.23960°N 14.77283°E
  - elevation: 564 metres (1,850 ft)
- Mouth: Ranelva
  - location: Rana Municipality, Norway
  - coordinates: 66.33879°N 14.3239°E
  - elevation: 19 metres (62 ft)
- Length: 27 km (17 mi)
- Basin size: 437 km^{2} (169 sq mi)

Basin features
- River system: Ranelva

Plura is a river in Rana Municipality in Nordland county, Norway. The river begins at the lake Kallvatnet, flows through the Plurdalen valley, and ends up as a tributary to the river Ranelva, about 10 kilometres (6.2 mi) north of the town of Mo i Rana. The river is rich with salmon, trout, and Arctic char. The name comes from the Norwegian verb "prula" which means "boiling" or "seething".

The Plura river flows both over and beneath the ground, and it has the longest subterranean flow in Norway at 3.8 kilometres (2.4 mi). Until 1964, Plura was a large river, washing limestone out of the mountain, creating several caves/tunnels down through the Plurdalen valley. Through the Pluragrotta cave, about 20,000 cubic metres (710,000 cu ft) of water passed each minute. The Kallvatnet dam made the river Plura almost dry, and the water in Pluragrotta cave became standing still like in a water seal.

== Media gallery ==
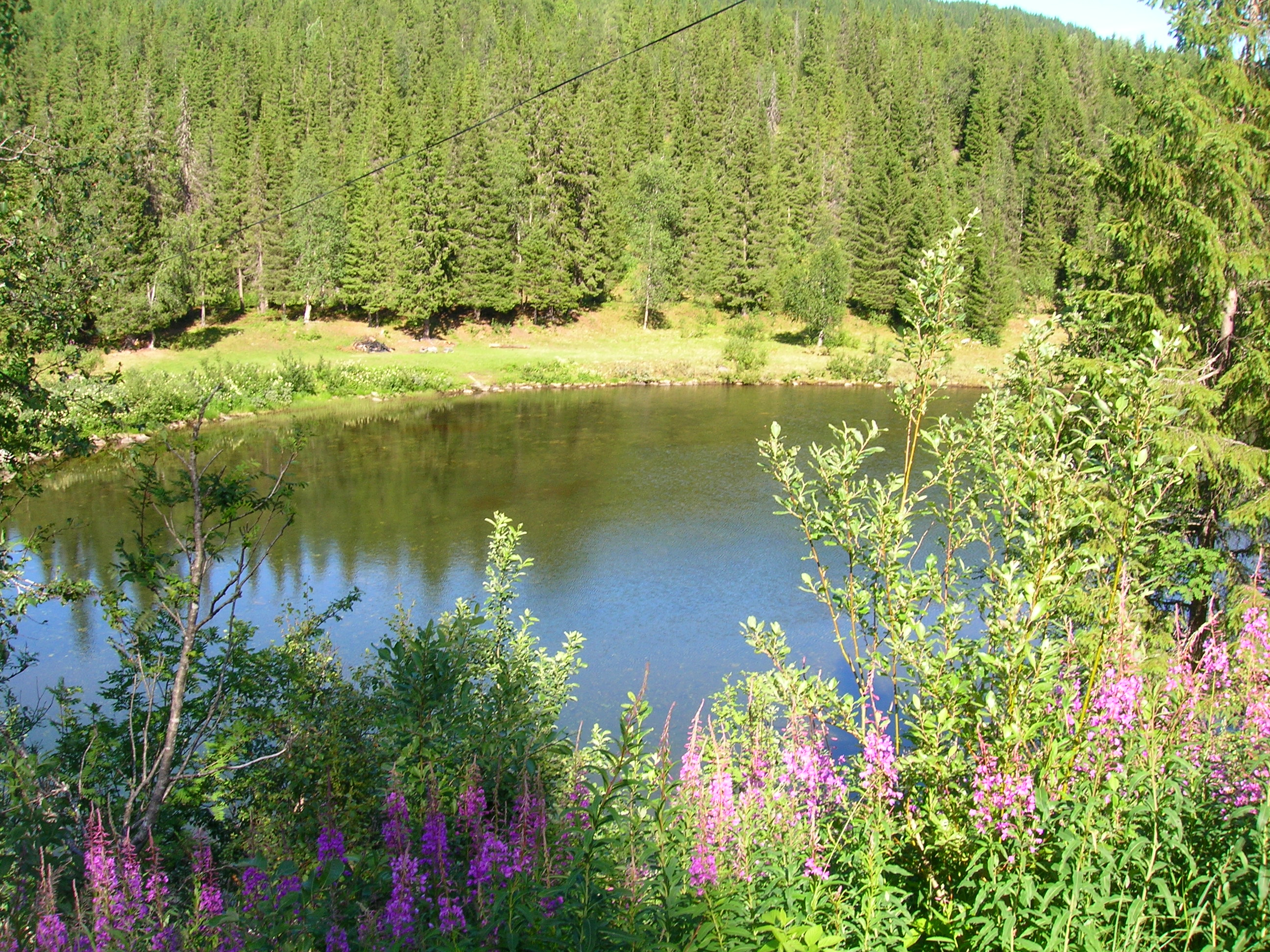

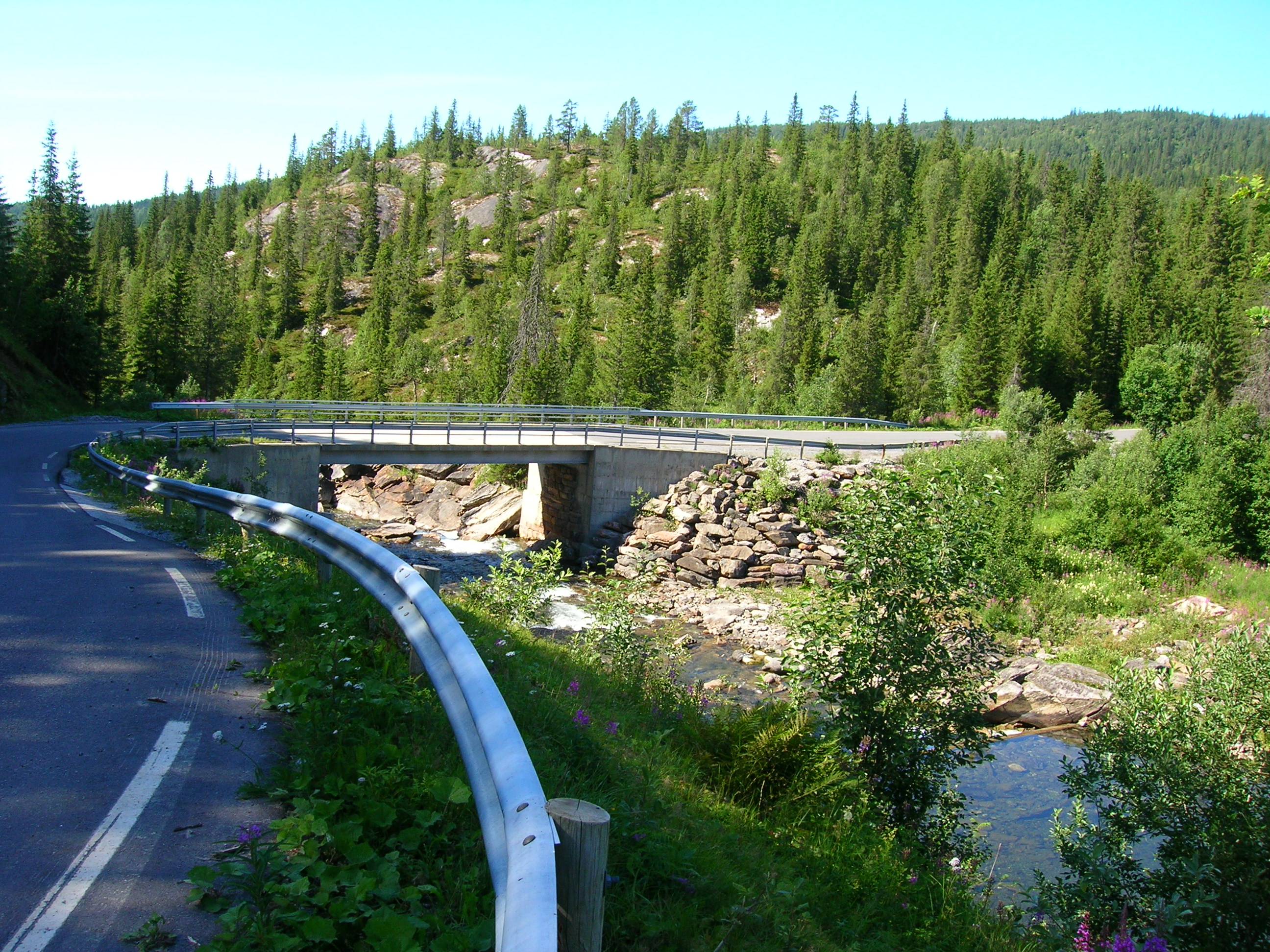

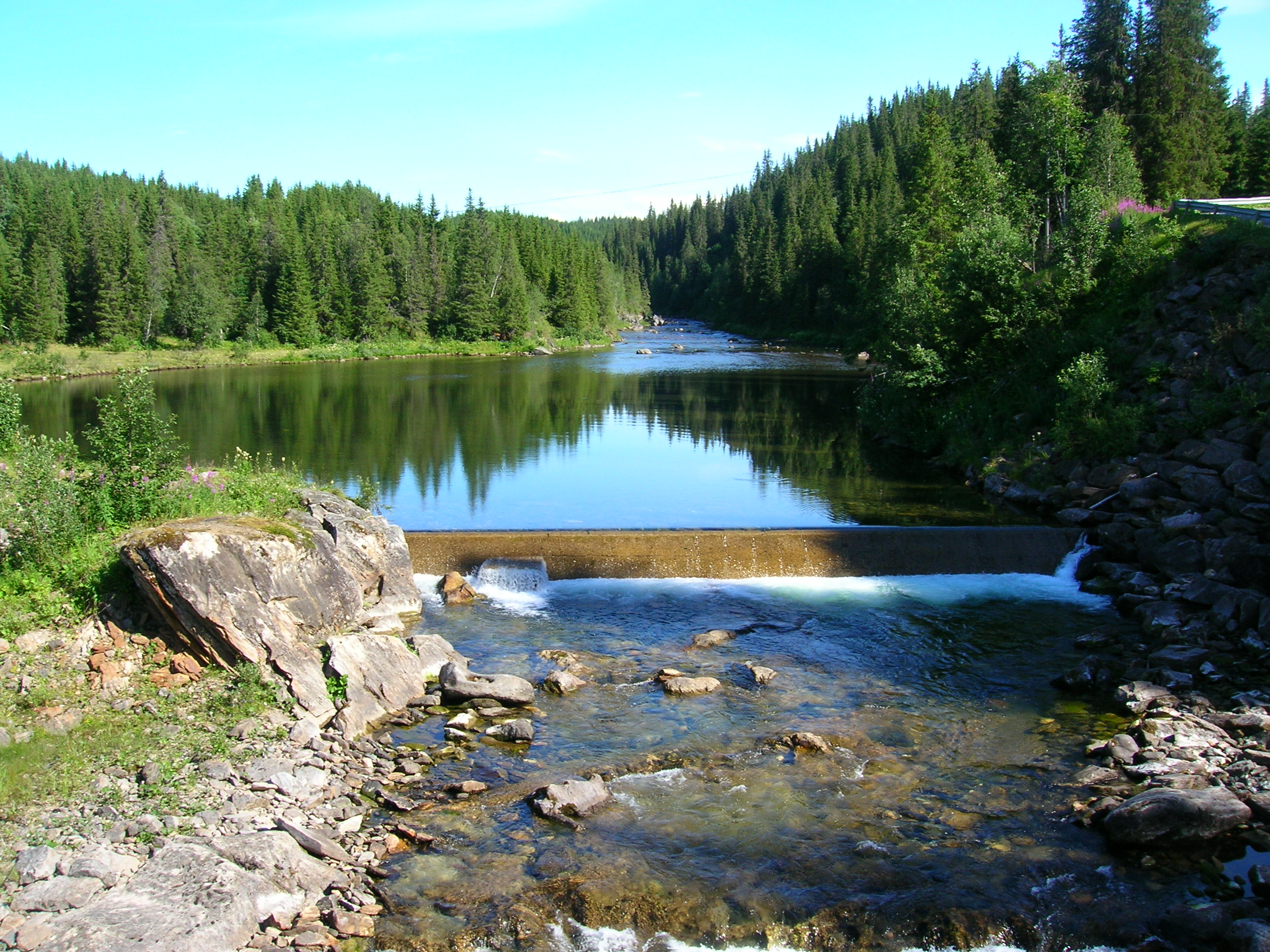

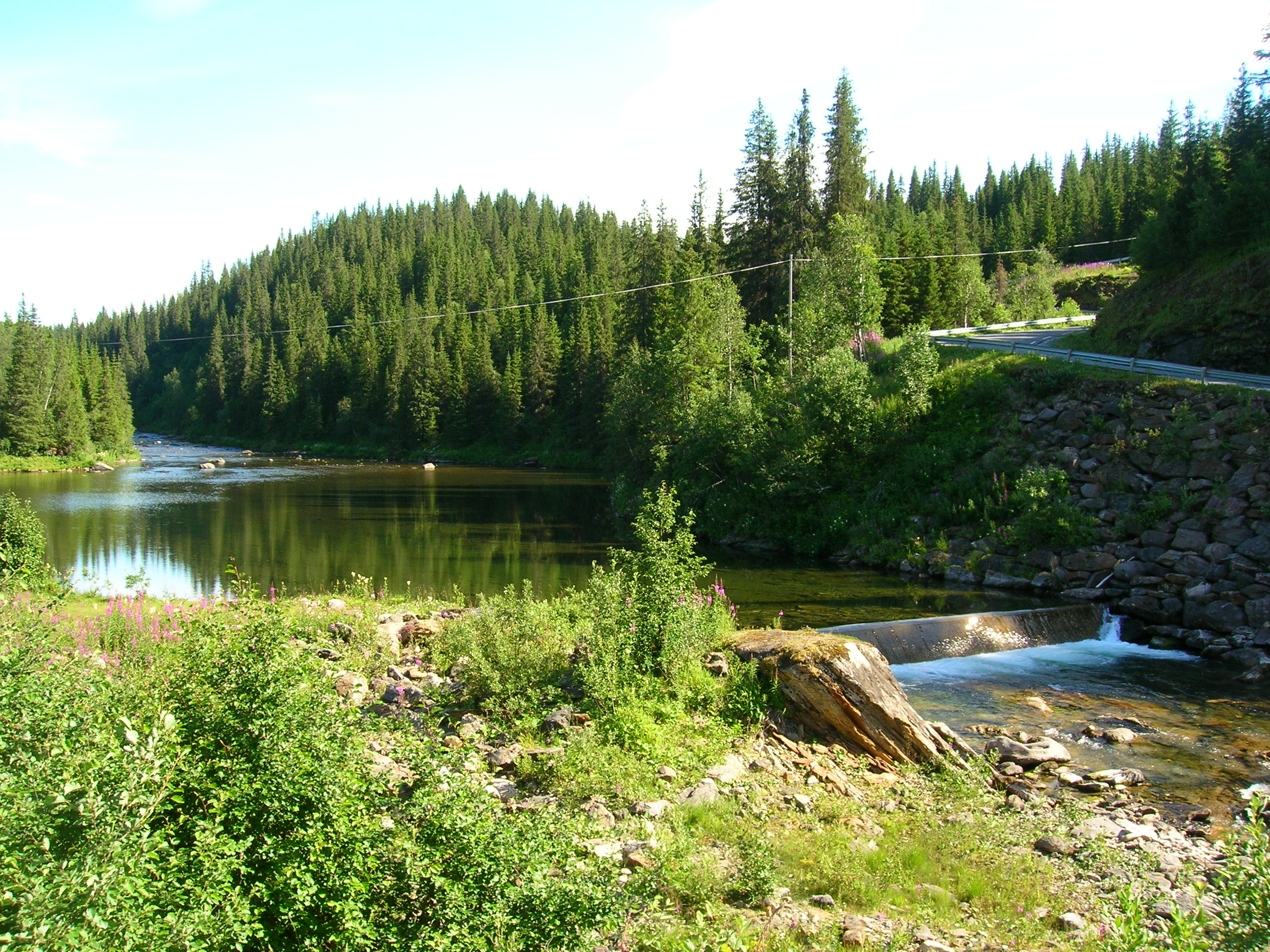

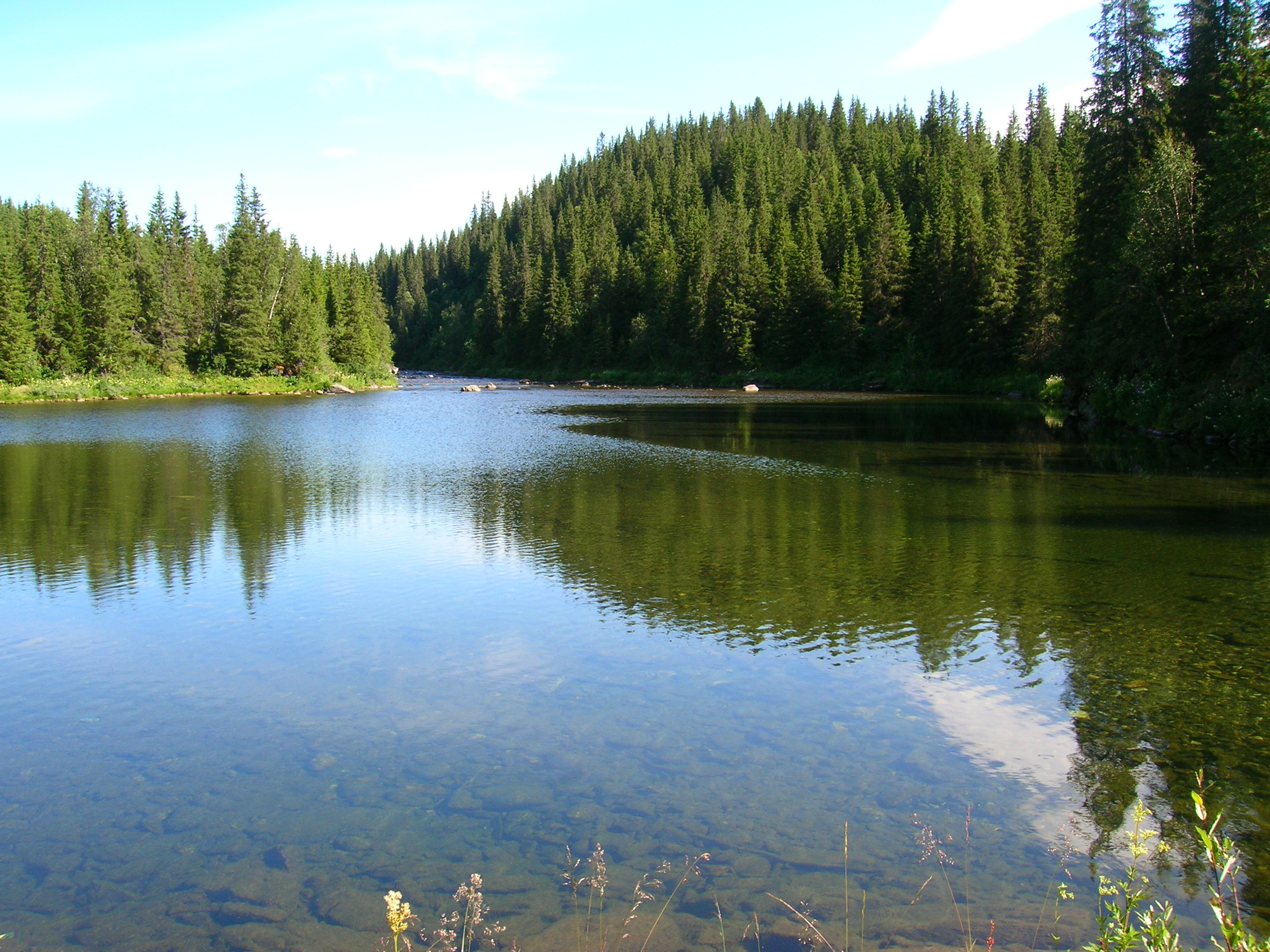

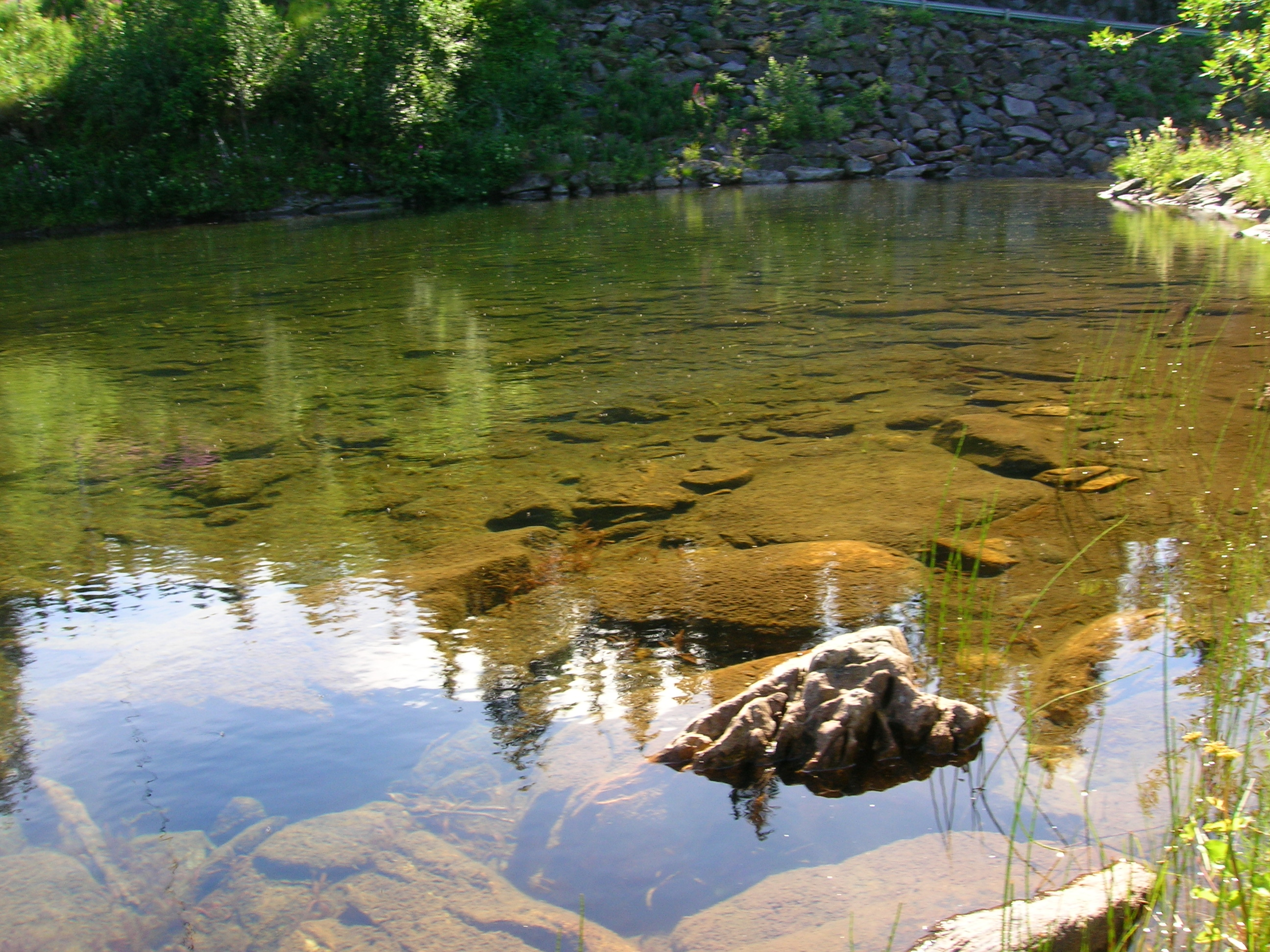

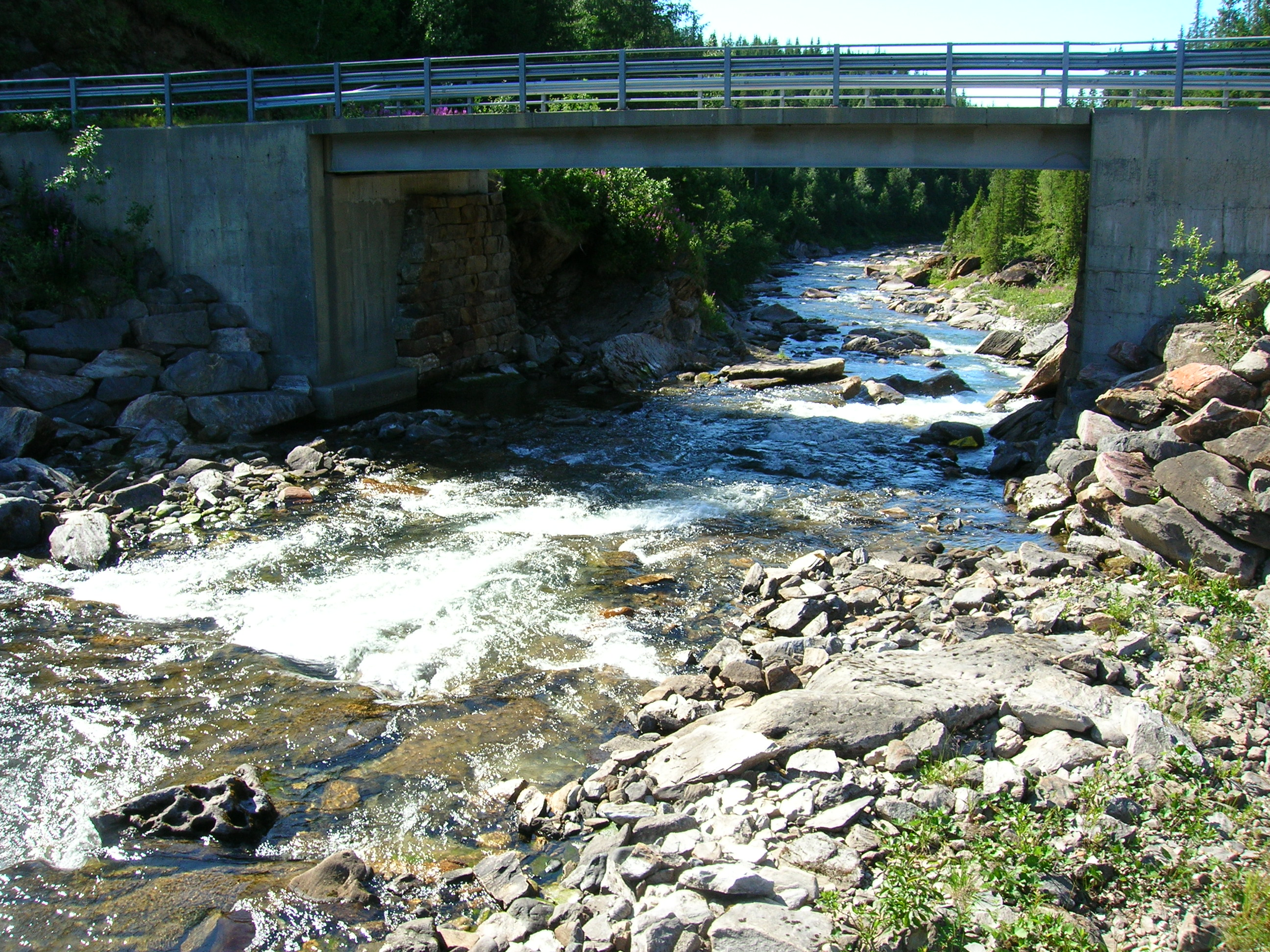

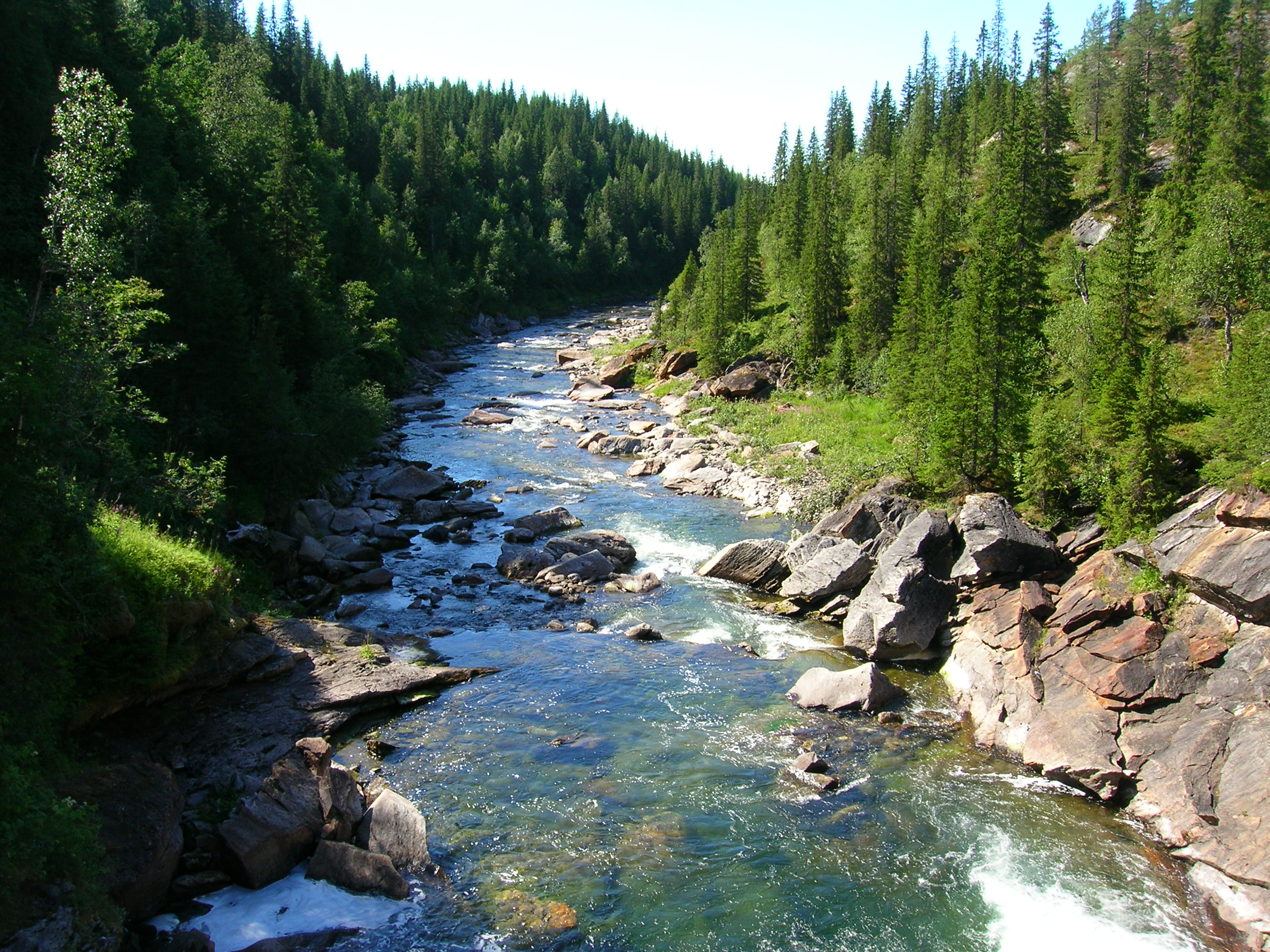

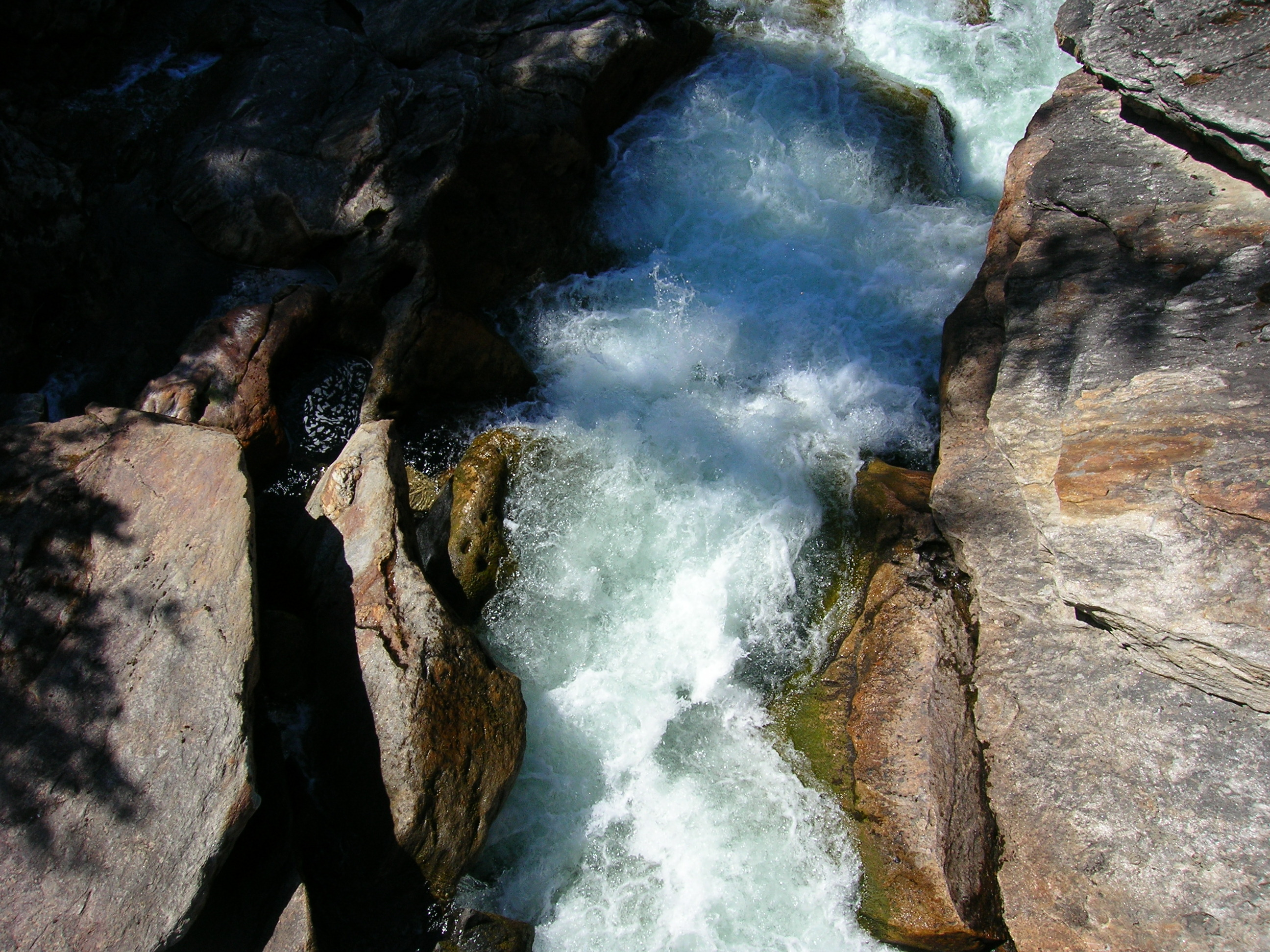

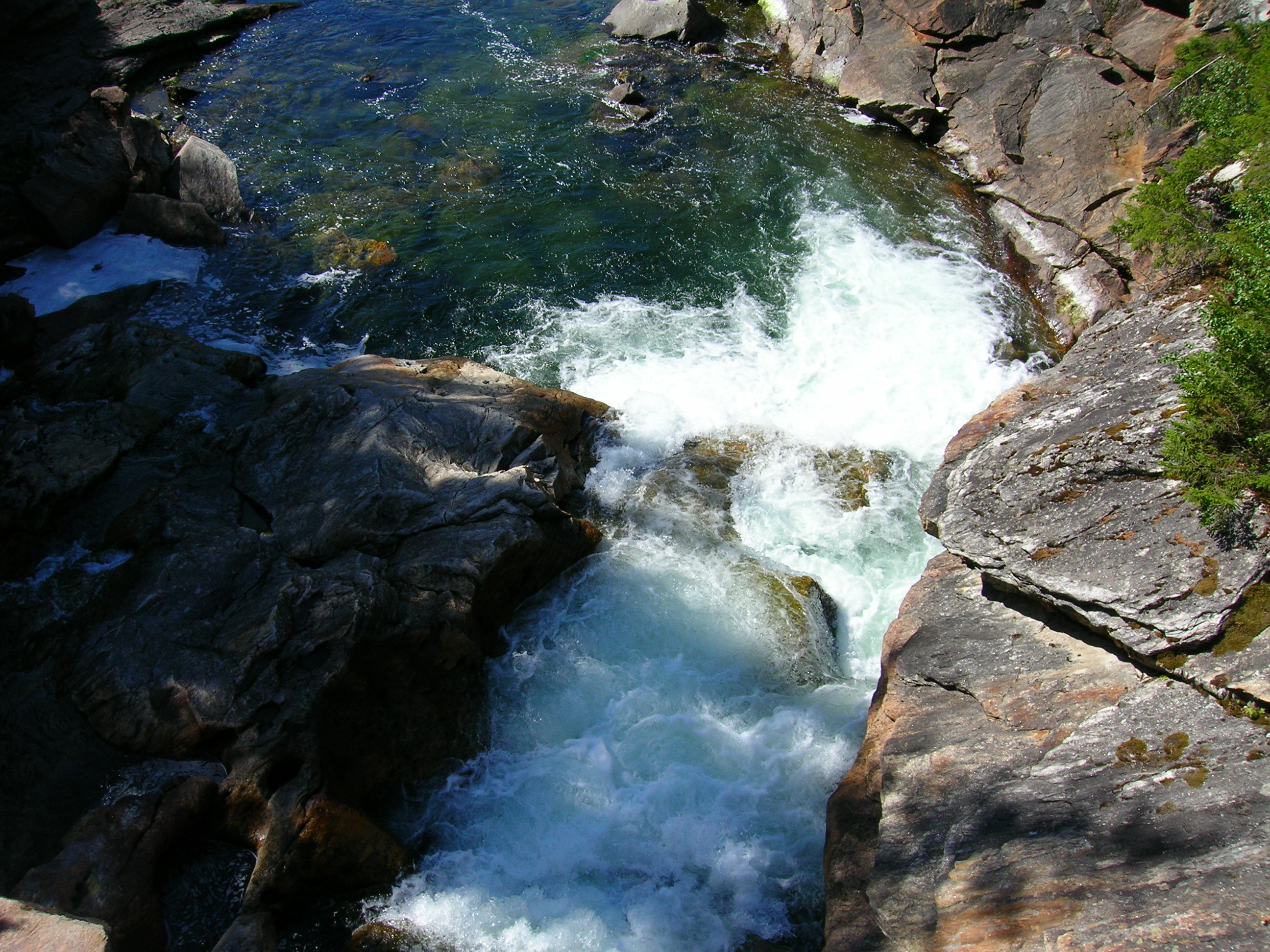

== See also ==
- List of rivers in Norway
