= Porrhomma =

Scientific classification
- Kingdom: Animalia
- Phylum: Arthropoda
- Subphylum: Chelicerata
- Class: Arachnida
- Order: Araneae
- Infraorder: Araneomorphae
- Family: Linyphiidae
- Genus: Porrhomma; Simon, 1884

Type species
- P. convexum (Westring, 1851)

Species
- 25, see text

Synonyms
- Opistoxys Simon, 1884

Genus of spiders

Porrhomma is a genus of sheet weavers that was first described by Eugène Louis Simon in 1884.

== Species ==
As of May 2021 it contains twenty-five species, found in Europe and Asia:

- Porrhomma altaica Růžička, 2018 – Altai (Russia, Kazakhstan)
- Porrhomma boreale (Banks, 1899) – Russia (Urals to Far East), Mongolia, USA (Alaska)
- Porrhomma borgesi Wunderlich, 2008 – Azores
- Porrhomma cambridgei Merrett, 1994 – England to Italy and Czechia
- Porrhomma campbelli F. O. Pickard-Cambridge, 1894 – Europe to Russia (Middle Siberia)
- Porrhomma cavernicola (Keyserling, 1886) – USA
- Porrhomma convexum (Westring, 1851) (type) – USA, Canada, Greenland, Europe, Caucasus, Russia (Europe, West Siberia), Kazakhstan
- Porrhomma egeria Simon, 1884 – Europe
- Porrhomma errans (Blackwall, 1841) – Western to Central Europe, Italy
- Porrhomma frasassianum Weiss & Sarbu, 2021 – Italy
- Porrhomma longjiangense Zhu & Wang, 1983 – Russia (South Siberia to Far East), China
- Porrhomma magnum Tanasevitch, 2012 – Russia (South Siberia), Kazakhstan
- Porrhomma microcavense Wunderlich, 1990 – Belgium, Netherlands, Germany, Czechia, Slovakia, Russia (Europe)
- Porrhomma microphthalmum (O. Pickard-Cambridge, 1871) – Europe, Russia (Europe, Caucasus), Turkey, Iran, Kazakhstan, China
- Porrhomma microps (Roewer, 1931) – Europe
- Porrhomma montanum Jackson, 1913 – Europe, Russia (Europe to Far East), Korea, Japan
- Porrhomma nekolai Růžička, 2018 – Russia (Far East), Canada, USA
- Porrhomma oblitum (O. Pickard-Cambridge, 1871) – Europe
- Porrhomma ohkawai Saito, 1977 – Japan
- Porrhomma pallidum Jackson, 1913 – Europe, Russia (Europe to Far East), Iran, Kazakhstan
- Porrhomma profundum M. Dahl, 1939 – Germany, Czechia, Slovakia, Hungary, Romania, Serbia, Bulgaria
- Porrhomma pygmaeum (Blackwall, 1834) – Europe, Turkey, Caucasus, Russia (Europe to Far East), Central Asia, Pakistan, Japan
- Porrhomma rakanum Yaginuma & Saito, 1981 – Japan
- Porrhomma rosenhaueri (L. Koch, 1872) – Western, Southern and Central Europe, Russia (Altai)
- Porrhomma terrestre (Emerton, 1882) – Canada, USA
