= Porrhomma terrestre =

Scientific classification
- Domain: Eukaryota
- Kingdom: Animalia
- Phylum: Arthropoda
- Subphylum: Chelicerata
- Class: Arachnida
- Order: Araneae
- Infraorder: Araneomorphae
- Family: Linyphiidae
- Genus: Porrhomma
- Species: P. terrestre

Binomial name
- Porrhomma terrestre (Emerton, 1882)

Species of spider

Porrhomma terrestre is a species of sheetweb spider in the family Linyphiidae. It is found in Canada and the United States.
