= Diving into the Unknown =

2016 Finnish film directed by Juan Reina

- Takaisin pintaan
- Directed by: Juan Reina
- Written by: Juan Reina
- Produced by: Juho Harjula
- Starring: Patrik Grönqvist, Kai Känkänen, Sami Paakkarinen, Vesa Rantanen
- Cinematography: Jarkko M. Virtanen, Tuukka Kovasiipi
- Music by: KAADA
- Production company: Monami Agency
- Distributed by: B-Plan Distribution
- Release dates: 27 January 2016 (Docpoint Helsinki); 19 February 2016 (Finland)
- Running time: 82 minutes
- Countries: Finland, Norway
- Languages: Finnish, Swedish, Norwegian, English

Diving into the Unknown (Finnish: Takaisin pintaan) is a 2016 Finnish documentary film directed by Juan Reina.

Four Finnish cave divers face their worst nightmare when two of their friends drown deep inside an underwater cave in Norway. When the official recovery operation is called off by the Norwegian and British authorities after being deemed too risky, the friends set out on a secret mission to retrieve the bodies themselves.

The film premiered at the 2016 Docpoint Helsinki on 27 January 2016 and had its international premiere in Visions du Réel film festival, Switzerland in April 2016.

== Synopsis ==
The film opens with footage of a group of Finnish divers attempting to swim through a cave system in Plurdalen, Norway. The dive requires them to cut through ice and swim down into the Plura cave to depths of over 130 metres (430 ft) before emerging on the other side in a dry cave. During the course of the dive, two from the team, Jari Huotarinen and Jari Uusimaki, died.

An international team of rescue divers attempted to retrieve the bodies but ultimately abandoned the attempt due to the dangers involved, and the caves were closed by the police. Despite this, the survivors of the original diving team planned a covert but well-supported return expedition to retrieve the bodies of their friends. They were accompanied by the documentary crew that had originally begun filming their attempt to swim through the cave, and the dives were recorded on helmet-worn cameras.

The retrieval attempt was ultimately successful and both bodies were brought to the surface. The Norwegian police decided not to press charges against the diver despite them breaking local rules, Grönqvist being already known for breaking local rules and for Paakarainen joining in.
