= Porrhomma convexum =

Scientific classification
- Domain: Eukaryota
- Kingdom: Animalia
- Phylum: Arthropoda
- Subphylum: Chelicerata
- Class: Arachnida
- Order: Araneae
- Infraorder: Araneomorphae
- Family: Linyphiidae
- Genus: Porrhomma
- Species: P. convexum

Binomial name
- Porrhomma convexum (Westring, 1851)

Species of spider

Porrhomma convexum is a species of sheetweb spider in the family Linyphiidae. It is found in Canada, Europe, Caucasus, and Russia (European).
