= Kallvatnet =

Lake in Rana, Norway

Kallvatnet (Norwegian) Gaallajaevrie (Southern Sami)
- Interactive map of the lake
- Location: Rana Municipality, Nordland
- Coordinates: 66.2351°N 14.8814°E
- Basin countries: Norway
- Max. length: 14 kilometres (8.7 mi)
- Max. width: 4.5 kilometres (2.8 mi)
- Surface area: 28.61 km^{2} (11.05 sq mi)
- Shore length^{1}: 63.24 kilometres (39.30 mi)
- Surface elevation: 564 metres (1,850 ft)
- References: NVE
- ^{1} Shore length is not a well-defined measure.

Kallvatnet (Norwegian) or Gaallajaevrie (Southern Sami) is a lake in Rana Municipality in Nordland county, Norway. The 28.61-square-kilometre (11.05 sq mi) lake lies about 25 kilometres (16 mi) southeast of the villages of Skonseng and Røssvoll.

== See also ==
- List of lakes in Norway
- Geography of Norway
