= Sommen =

Lake in Sweden

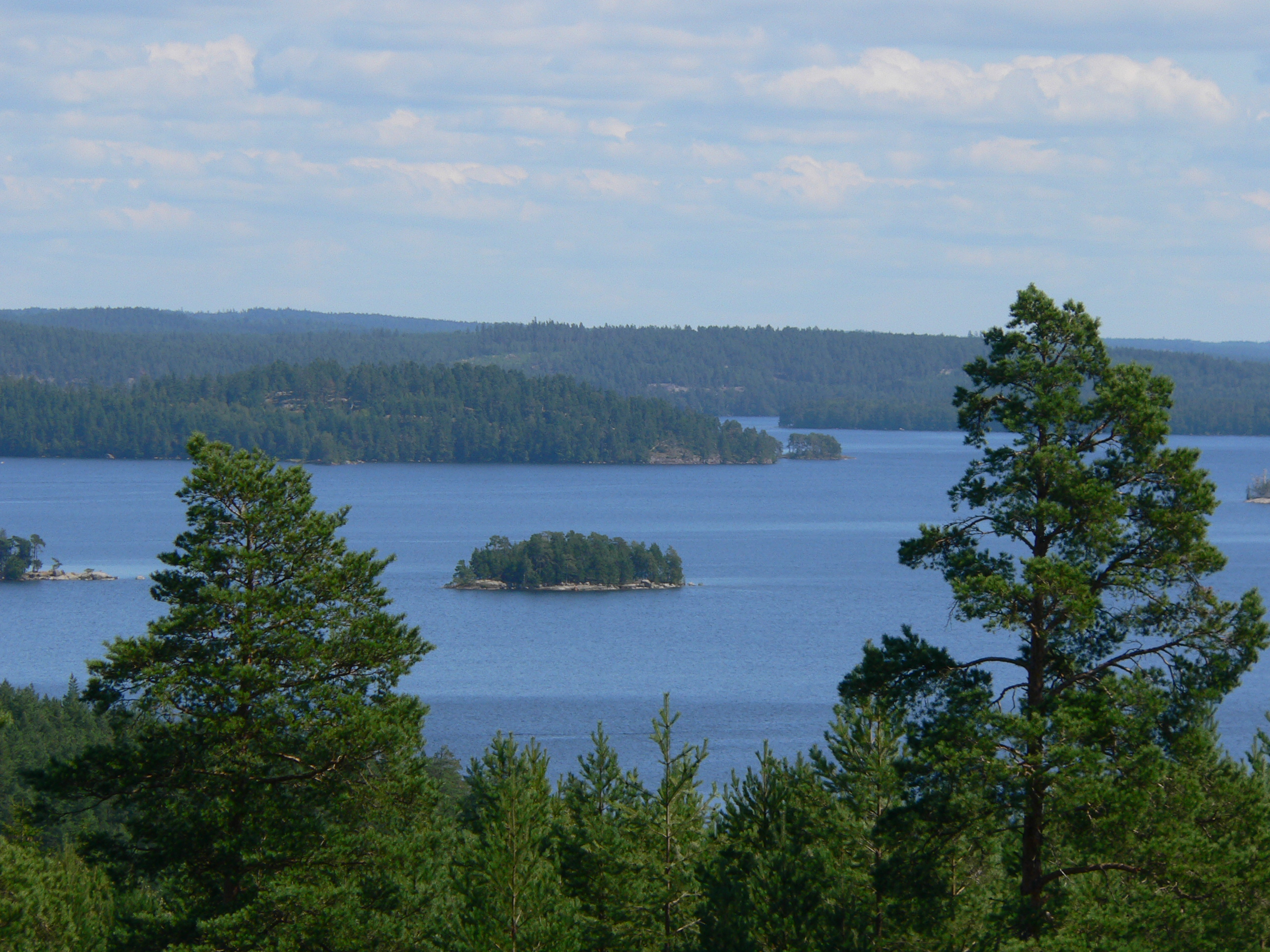
- Sommen seen from a hill in Torpön in summer

- Location within Östergötland Location within Sweden

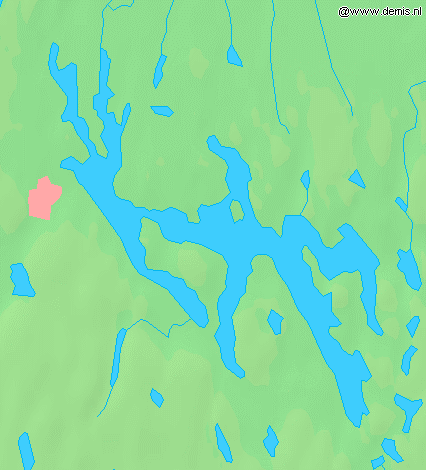
- Map, the city of Tranås is marked in red
- Location: southern Sweden
- Coordinates: 58°01′12″N 15°11′06″E
- Primary outflows: 11 m^{3}/s (390 cu ft/s)
- Basin countries: Sweden
- Surface area: 132 km^{2} (51 sq mi)
- Average depth: 17 m (56 ft)
- Max. depth: 53 m (174 ft)
- Water volume: 2,210,530,000 m^{3} (7.8064×10^{10} cu ft)
- Surface elevation: 147 m (482 ft)
- Islands: c. 260–300
- Settlements: Blåvik, Malexander, Sommen, Norra Vi, Torpa

Sommen (Swedish pronunciation: [ˈsʊ̂mːɛn]) is a lake in the South Swedish highlands lying across the border of the provinces of Östergötland and Småland. Situated about 147 metres above mean sea level, the lake has an area of 132 km^{2} (51 sq mi) and has a maximum depth of 60 metres. The lake is shared between the administrative kommunes of Ydre, Kinda, Boxholm and Tranås and the area around it is sparsely populated.

The lake has very clear water, with a visibility of 8 to 10 metres deep, if conditions are good. This makes Sommen one of the greatest clear-water lakes in Sweden. According to tradition Sommen has 365 islands, one for each day of the year. The actual number is around 260.

In and around the lake various rare species are protected in a series of nature reserves, bird sanctuaries and areas closed for fishing. Måltorpet Granbo in Sommen is a Natura 2000 area.

The visitor centre and natural history museum, Naturum Sommen, lies at the northern end of Torpön island, near the central part of the lake.

According to the Svensk ortnamnslexikon the lake name was given as Sooma in 1447 and is derived from the local dialect word somma meaning an oversized vessel. This may be in relation to the lake's size or the cliffs along its shores. Scholar Robert Norrby considered that the name Sommen originated as a noa-name – an unknown sacred or taboo name that the lake had.

== History ==
=== Origin myth ===
Local mythology asserts that the lake was created by a cow called Urkon or Sommakoa. The lake basin was carved by Urkon with her hooves during an outburst of wrath; subsequently the basin was filled with water which became the lake. Following this, the wizard Somme from Tullerum locked Urkon in a cave, Urkons Grotta. It was said that she would escape when a crowned king visited the district of Ydre, where the lake lies, and kill him. According to folklore this was the fate of the legendary king Frode. As Frode was passing through Ydre, Urkon escaped and chased him; when he thought he had left Ydre and was thus safe, the cow killed him. At present there are two commemorative raised stones at Fruhammar, the location of this purported event.

In Urkons Grotta, the cow is said to rest on a bed of mineral coal and fur. Each Christmas Urkon eats one hair straw from the fur, and when she has eaten all straws it is said that she will come out and bring about the end of the world.

=== Danish crossing on the frozen lake ===
In 1568, amidst the Northern Seven Years' War, a Danish raiding party led by Daniel Rantzau managed to escape back to Denmark by crossing over the frozen lake, avoiding Swedish defences to the west and east. The escape made it possible for the raiding party to burn down Eksjö further south along their retreat.

=== Age of log driving and barges ===
During much of the 19th and 20th century the lake was used for log driving. This activity peaked around World War I and declined as the road network around the lake improved. Wood and coal from various charcoal piles near the lakeshore were also transported in large wooden barges. By 1945 fifteen barges were operating in the lake as were the steamboats Boxholm I and Boxholm II that served as tugboats. At present only one barge survives at the naturum Sommen museum. In 1973 log driving ceased for good.

=== Sommaskep revival ===
The lake is known for its unique wooden boats called sommaskep. Sommaskep are for rowing, and differ from ordinary small traditional wooden boats in Sweden for having a longer stem. An explanation for this design is that it makes boats easier to navigate in the typically short-wavelength waves of Sommen. The tradition of building sommaskep has been kept alive as Gunnar Gustavsson, a local carpenter, was tasked by the local history society of Torpa with building sommaskep in the early 1990s; he made a copy of an antique sommaskep in Malexander. In recent times sommaskep boats have been built in Malexander (2007, 2016).

== Climate and vegetation ==
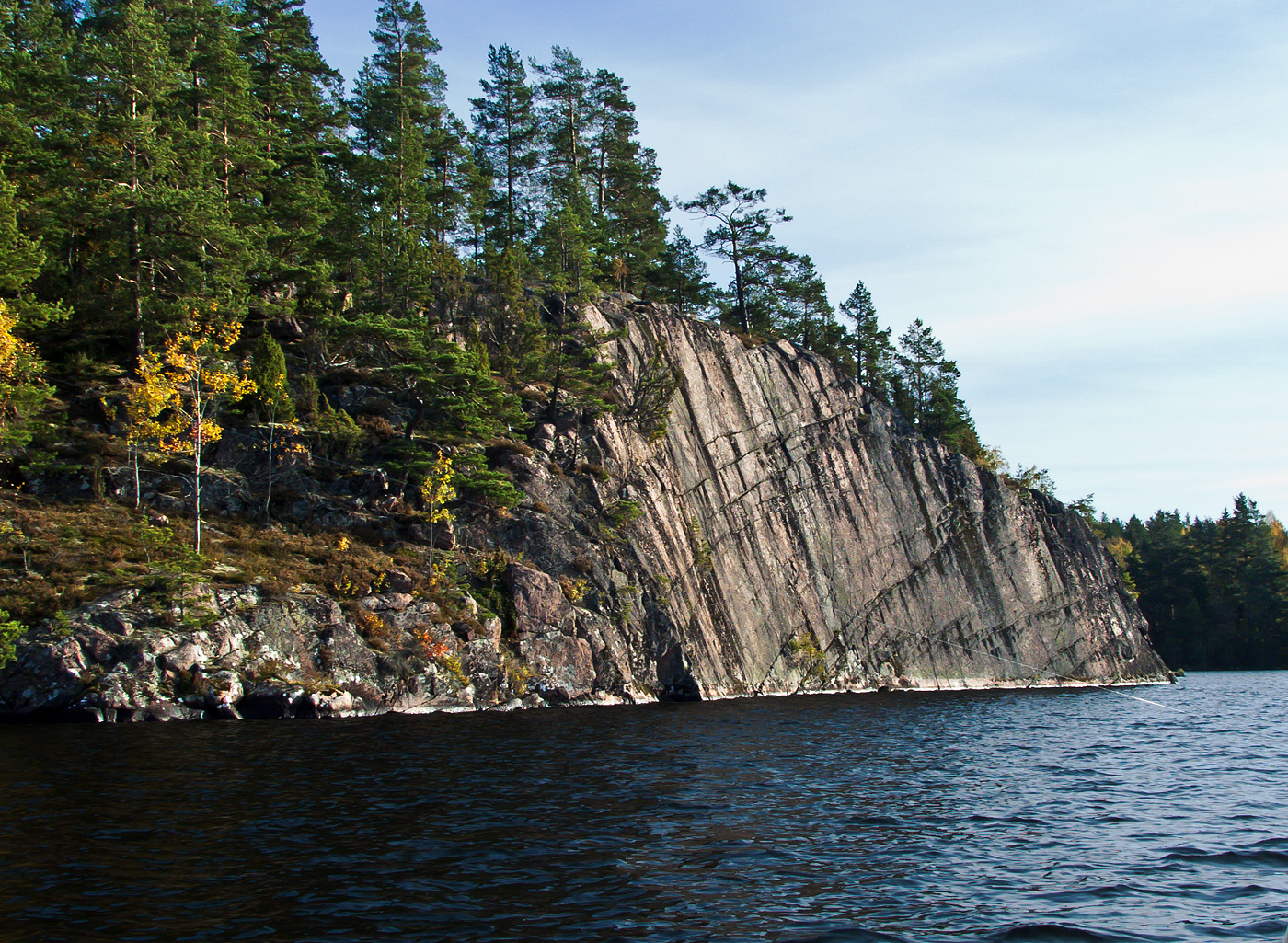
Pines and birches along a cliff in lake Sommen, October 2011

Relative to other areas of southern Sweden, Sommen stands out for its low precipitation and low humidity. The rainiest months of the year are September followed by July and August. Each of these months have a precipitation of around 70mm. The driest months are February and March, with around 35mm each. (Note: Precipitation is given for Norra Vi 1961–1990.) The hottest months are June, July and August averaging 14–15 °C. The coldest months are January and February with an average temperature of about -4 °C. (Note: Temperatures are given for Malexander 1961–1990.) The climate is expected to become warmer and drier in future.

The growing season around Sommen is of about 216 days with 2614 degree days. The vegetation around the lake is mostly dominated by pine and spruce forest. Broad-leaf forest and open agricultural fields can also be found at some locations. In particular the southern side of the lake contains more lush vegetation and broad-leaf forest than the northern side, which has more cliffs and contiguous pine forest. The rare and endangered flower Anthericum liliago can be found along the lake's rocky shores. This is one of the northernmost locales where it grows.

On Torpön island is Sweden's largest wych elm and at Asby, a few kilometres from the southern shores, grows Sweden's thickest spruce. The name Ydre, which was formerly applied to most of the area around Sommen, is interpreted to mean "place of yews". One locality in particular appears to be further associated with yews; this is Idebo along Norra Vifjärden. (Note: Also, about 33 km (21 mi) east of Sommen there is a locality named Idhult, probably also linked to yews.)

Some plants usually associated with carbonate rock areas appear as rarities near Sommen, since there are no known carbonate rock outcrops in the area. The plants are Vicia pisiformis and the orchids Ophrys myoides, Malaxis monophyllos and Herminium monorchis. (Note: Vicia pisiformis can be found in carbonate-rich areas in Kolmården and Kinnekulle, while the aforementioned orchids are best known in Sweden from calcium-rich fens in Gotland and Öland.)

== Geology ==
Geographically the lake lies within the South Swedish highlands at a place where the Sub-Cambrian peneplain is uplifted. The present landscape is one of a hilly joint valley terrain. Topography displays local height differences as large as 100 m.

Granite weathered into grus can be found at various locations around the lake. Red granite is a common rock around the lake and various parts are covered with till, including ground till deposited during the Ice Age. During the Weichsel glaciation, glacier ice moved over the Sommen area from the north-northwest. Drumlin-like forms and crags are also found throughout the area around Sommen. The ice sheets brought in carbonate rock and sediment from more northern latitudes to the Sommen area, depositing carbonates near the southern shores. This has made soils there richer in calcium than those further south.

=== Deglaciation ===
Late Baltic Ice Lake around 10,300 B.C.,
with a channel near Mount Billingen
through the Central Swedish lowland.
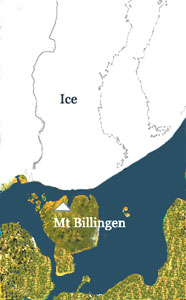

Following its maximum extent about 20,000–17,000 years ago the Fennoscandian ice sheet began to shrink gradually. The ice sheet's northward retreat brought the ice-front to the area of Sommen about 12,000 years ago. At this point the ice remained locally stagnant as it melted, with ice persisting longer in valleys than in hills and ridges. Thus the ice-front during deglaciation is thought to have been highly sinuous. Stagnation of the ice led to the formation of hummocky moraine and glacifluvial deposits. With its water surface at 146 metres above sea level, Sommen is slightly above the highest postglacial coastline (Swedish: högsta kustlinjen, HK) at 137 metres. This ancient coastline corresponds to the coastline of the Baltic Ice Lake during the Younger Dryas. These are near the lake's eastern shores with patterned ground which presumably formed during the periglaciation of the area during the Younger Dryas. The biogeography of various aquatic species deemed glacial relicts that are found in Sommen is likely related to a different geography during the early history of the lake. One theory claims that aquatic species were transferred from the Baltic Ice Lake through a natural lock system in connection with a temporary advance of the ice-front during the Younger Dryas. On land, the unusual occurrence of dwarf birch near Sund is also judged to be a leftover from a cold geological past.

At present the post-glacial rebound of the crust in the lake area is uneven. At the lake's outlet in the northwest it is 2.36mm per year while in the eastern Svanaviken it is 2.05mm. This means the lake is being slowly tilted and the southeastern shores drowned while near the outlet land is being dried up.

== Wildlife ==
=== Birds ===
Large birds that breed in the area include fish hawk, European herring gull, heron and black-throated loon. Inventories of these four birds were taken in 1974, 1980, 1994 and 2012. According to this data, populations of European herring gulls and heron appear to have declined. Other water birds that breed in the area include oystercatcher, common gull, black-headed gull, common tern, common sandpiper, goosander, great crested grebe, mute swan and Canada goose, together with two duck species; mallard and common goldeneye. Various pairs of peregrine falcon nest in the lake area; this species was almost extinct in Sweden in the 1970s.

An inventory made in 2018 showed that during summer about 1,000 cormorants live in the lake area. As cormorants feed on fish, their population is thought to impact on the amount of fish, possibly producing an ecological disturbance. Hunting of cormorants is allowed under certain conditions from 2019 to 2023.

=== Fish ===
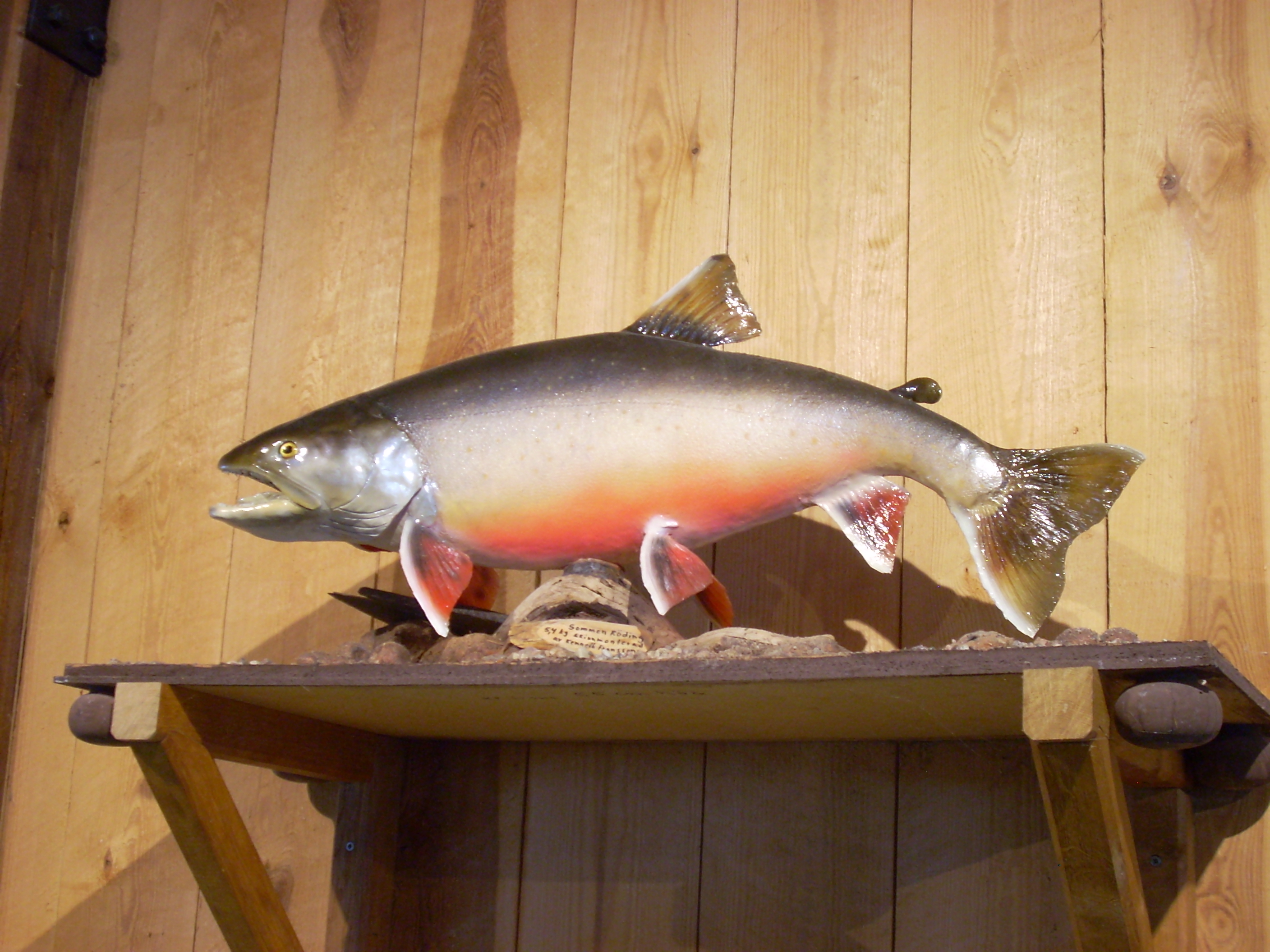
Model of a 5,4 kg Sommen charr in naturum Sommen

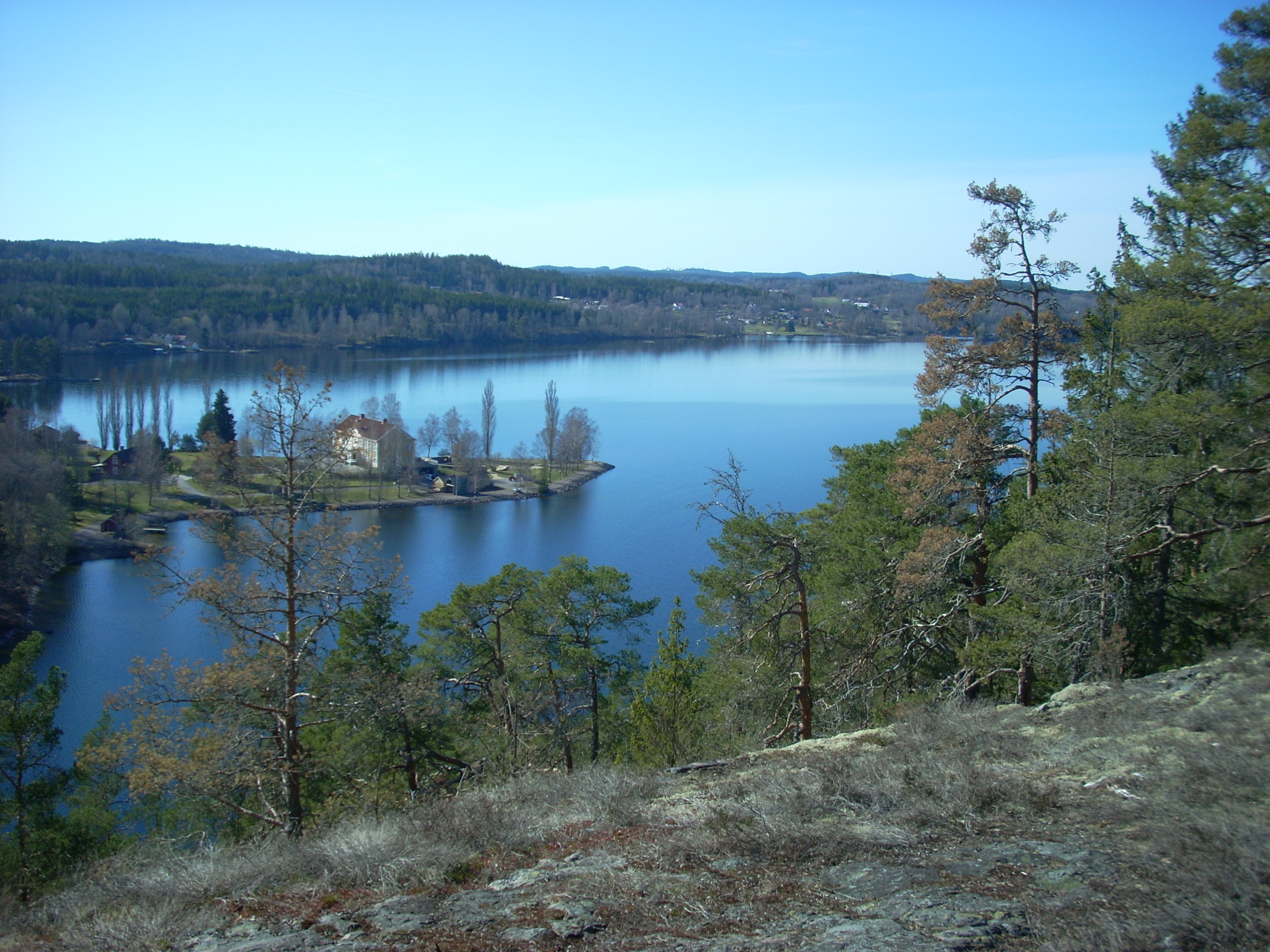
Partial view of Norra Vifjärden from Vassvikberget nature reserve. It is in Norra Vifjärden where Sommen charr is usually found.

Twenty-two species of fish are found in Sommen. Common fish in the lake are Eurasian perch, northern pike, brown trout, common whitefish, Sommen charr, smelt, burbot, European eel, ruffe and vendace. Less common fishes include common roach, common bream, tench, vimba and common bleak.

==== Sommen charr ====
Lake Sommen is home to a subspecies of charr called Sommen charr (Swedish: Sommenröding). This subspecies originated in the distant past in connection with the deglaciation of the lake basin and the formation of various ephemeral ice-dammed lakes (Sydsvenska issjökomplexet). Subsequently, the population was left isolated for thousands of years. Populations of Sommen charr declined over the 20th century, leading to the fish being declared endangered in 1970. The causes of the decline are likely to include overfishing, fishing of immature individuals, unnatural lake level changes (as the lake is regulated), and competition from introduced species. The largest known Sommen charr weighed almost 9 kg, and was for a while the largest ordinary charr (Swedish: storröding) fished in Sweden.

The three largest arms of Sommen, Tranåsfjärden, Asbyfjärden and Norra Vifjärden, host most of the Sommen charr population. The bays near Malexander and Norravifjärden (the central and southeastern part of the lake) host most of the fish. Lek locations lie chiefly along the eastern shores of Norravifjärden and around Malexander in the north-central parts of the lake.

Compared to the charr of Lake Vättern, only large individuals of Sommen charr breed; this may be the result of overfishing. In Sommen, charr reach sexual maturity at around 7 years of age. At 6 years Sommen charrs are estimated to reach an average length of 54 cm, while at 7 years of age average length is 60 cm. For comparison, charr in Lake Vättern reach sexual maturity (lek for the first time) at 6 to 8 years when the females have reached lengths of 40–55 cm and the males 35–45 cm. The implication of this difference is that Sommen charr either reach maturity later than charr in Vättern, or that they grow faster.

=== Crustaceans ===
The two large crustaceans of the lake, the signal crayfish and the noble crayfish, are not as abundant as fish. The signal crayfish is an introduced species. The lake stands out for having three crustacean species that are relicts from the time of the Fennoscandian Ice Sheet deglaciation about 12,000 years ago. These species are Pallasea quadrispinosa, Mysis relicta and Limnocalanus macrurus. However, the lake lacks the most common relict crustacean found in the lakes of southern Sweden, the Mysis relicta.

== Environmental concerns ==
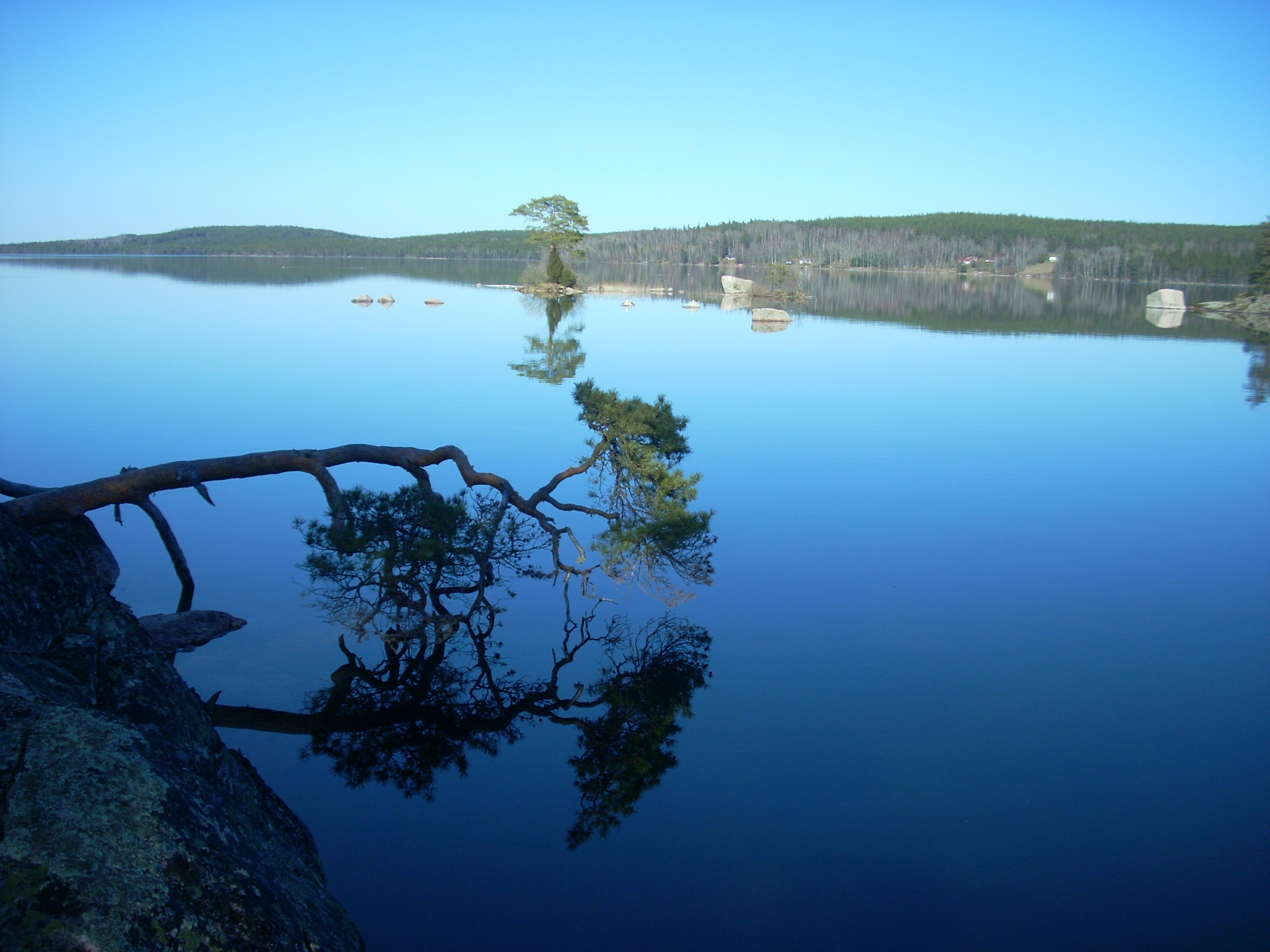
View from Torpön naturresevat in the southern tip of Torpön

While the eastern parts of the lake have higher eutrophication values than the west, it does not qualify as an environmental problem in the lake as a whole. Neither is there any considerable acidification as seen in other Swedish lakes; however high cadmium and fluoride contents are an environmental concern.

Extremely high concentrations of dioxins have been found in the vicinity of Brandnäs sågverk, a former lumber mill that closed in the 1950s. Most of this pollution is concentrated in the soil next to the mill in northern Torpön.
