= Pärvie Fault =

Geological fault in Sweden

Coordinates: 67°34′7.63″N 18°54′3.53″E

Pärvie Fault (Swedish: Pärvieförkastningen) is a large geological fault located in Northwestern Sweden. The fault is about 155 km long and is the longest known postglacial fault in the world. The fault had a major period of seismic activity following the deglaciation of Fennoscandia about 10,000 years ago. It is one of several postglacial faults in northern Sweden that remain seismically active.
