= Sommen charr =

Subspecies of fish

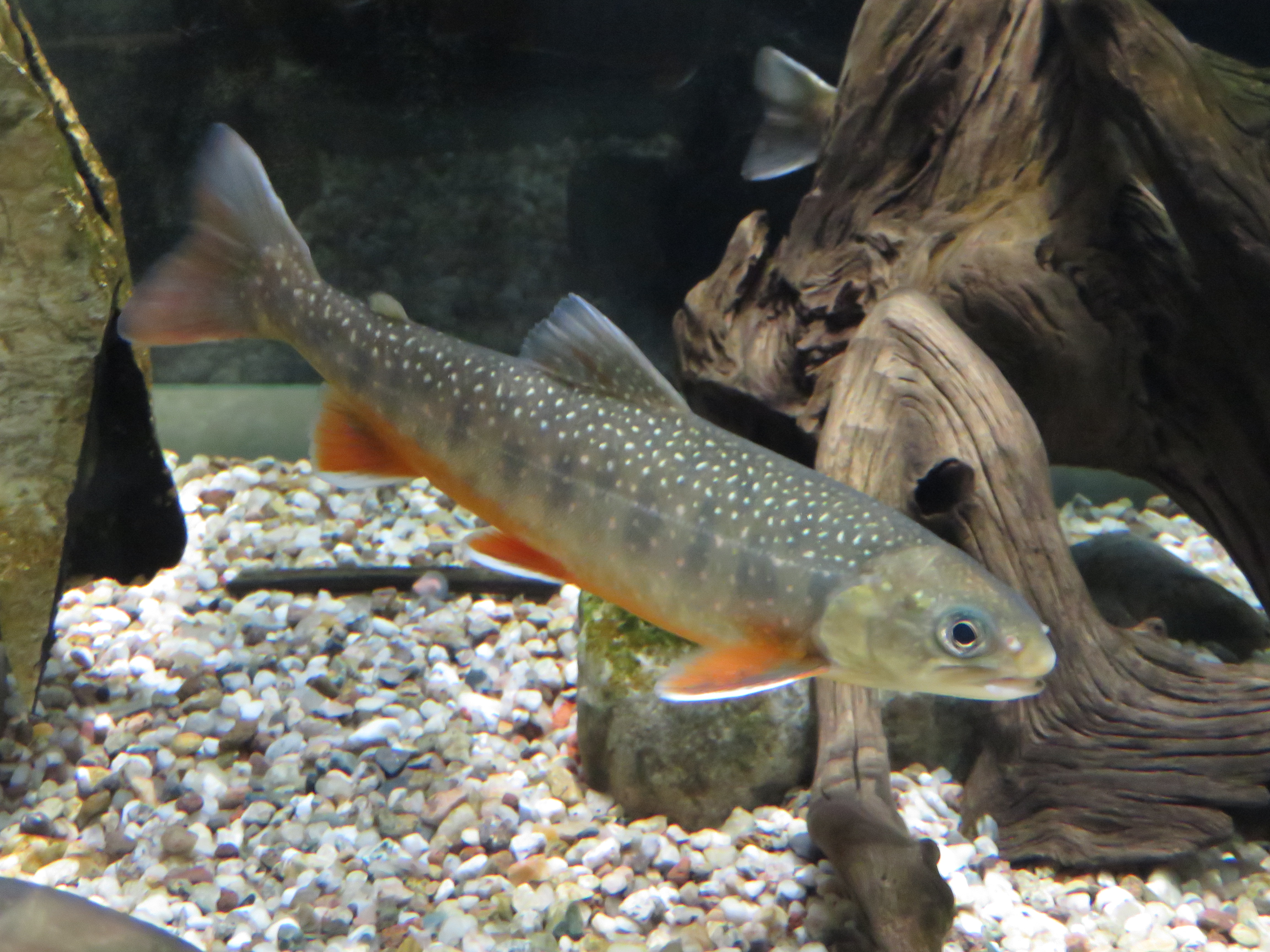
A young Arctic charr from Lake Inari in northern Finland, a relative of the Sommen charr

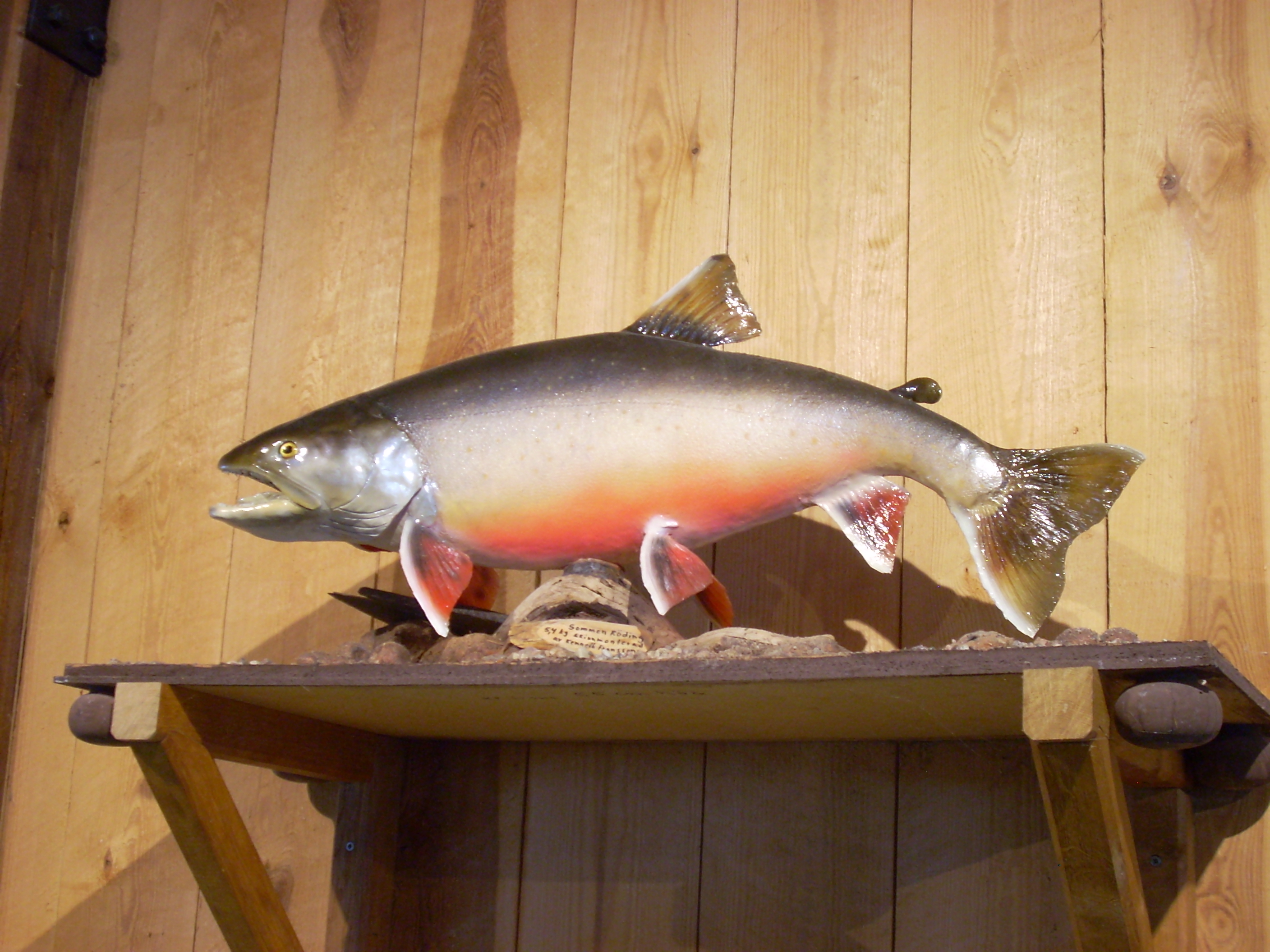
Model of a 5.4-kilogram (12 lb) Sommen charr in Naturum Sommen

The Sommen charr (Swedish: Sommenröding) is a population or subspecies of Arctic charr found in Lake Sommen. It is one of twenty-two species of fish found in the lake.

This population and other Arctic charrs in southern Sweden are regarded as relict populations at the southern edge of the natural distribution of Arctic charrs. Survival of Arctic charrs at the southern edge of their natural range is explained by Lake Sommen having a great depth (53 metres (174 ft)) with cold and oxygen-rich bottom waters. Sommen charr may also draw benefits from the lake's richness in fish species and the complex ecology it implies.

Populations of Sommen charr declined over the 20th century, leading to the fish being declared endangered in 1970. The causes of the decline are likely to include overfishing, fishing of immature individuals, unnatural lake level changes (as the lake is regulated), and competition from introduced species. The largest known Sommen charr weighed almost 9 kilograms (20 lb), and was for a while the largest Arctic charr fished in Sweden.

The three largest arms of Sommen, Tranåsfjärden, Asbyfjärden and Norra Vifjärden, host most of the Sommen charr population. Lek locations lie chiefly along the eastern shores of Norravifjärden and around Malexander in the north-central parts of the lake. Studies have shown that the substrate in most lek places is bedrock, boulders, gravel and pebbles while only a minority are on sand.

Other nearby populations of Arctic charr are found in the lakes Vättern, Ören and Mycklaflon. In Drögen, 10 km to the northeast of Sommen, Arctic charr is considered to have gone extinct.

== Growth and sexual maturity ==
Sommen charrs are among the fastest growing Arctic charrs in northern Europe. Albeit experiments show that at low temperatures (4 °C (39 °F)) Arctic charrs from more northern lakes grow faster.

Compared to the charr of Lake Vättern, only large individuals of Sommen charr breed; this may be the result of overfishing. In Sommen, charr reach sexual maturity at around seven years of age. This is relatively late maturation compared to other charrs. At six years, Sommen charrs are estimated to reach an average length of 54 centimetres (21 in), while at seven years of age, the average length is 60 centimetres (24 in). For comparison, charr in Lake Vättern reach sexual maturity (lek for the first time) at six-to-eight years when the females have reached lengths of 40–55 centimetres (16–22 in) and the males 35–45 centimetres (14–18 in). The implication of this difference is that Sommen charr either reach maturity later than charr in Vättern, or that they grow faster.

The fast growth of Sommen charr compared to other Arctic charrs is interpreted to be an adaptation to avoid predation from northern pike, brown trout, burbot and perch. Alternatively fast growth could also be an adaptation that allows for an early shift to piscivory among young charrs.

== Origin and taxonomy ==
The taxonomy of charrs is rather complex and not fully clear. In Sweden Sommen charr classify as a storröding, the largest of three types of Arctic charr traditionally recognised in the country. The other types are större fjällröding and mindre fjällröding. Wherever these types occur together in the same lake storröding is the largest. In Finland and Northwestern Russia charrs with the storröding phenotype have been classified as Salvelinus lepechini and Salvelinus umbla.

The Sommen charr originated in the distant past in connection with the deglaciation of the lake basin and the formation of various ephemeral ice-dammed lakes (Sydsvenska issjökomplexet). Subsequently, the population was left isolated for thousands of years. As the Sommen charr has near-identical mDNA to the Arctic charrs of nearby Lake Vättern and Lake Ladoga in Russia, it is thought these Swedish populations arrived from the east. While genetic studies have shown there is some gene flow between Sommen charr and other charr populations it is understood that strong natural selection keeps population or subspecies different.
