= Brahälla =

Ruined hunting lodge in Tranås municipality, Sweden

Coordinates: 57°59′34″N 14°43′32″E

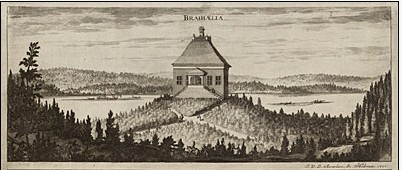
Brahehälla on a copperplate engraving by Erik Dahlbergh from the late 17th century. From Suecia antiqua et hodierna, not entirely reliable.

Brahälla (also Brahehälla) is a former hunting lodge, now a ruin, on a cliff above lake Noen in Tranås municipality, Jönköping county in Sweden.

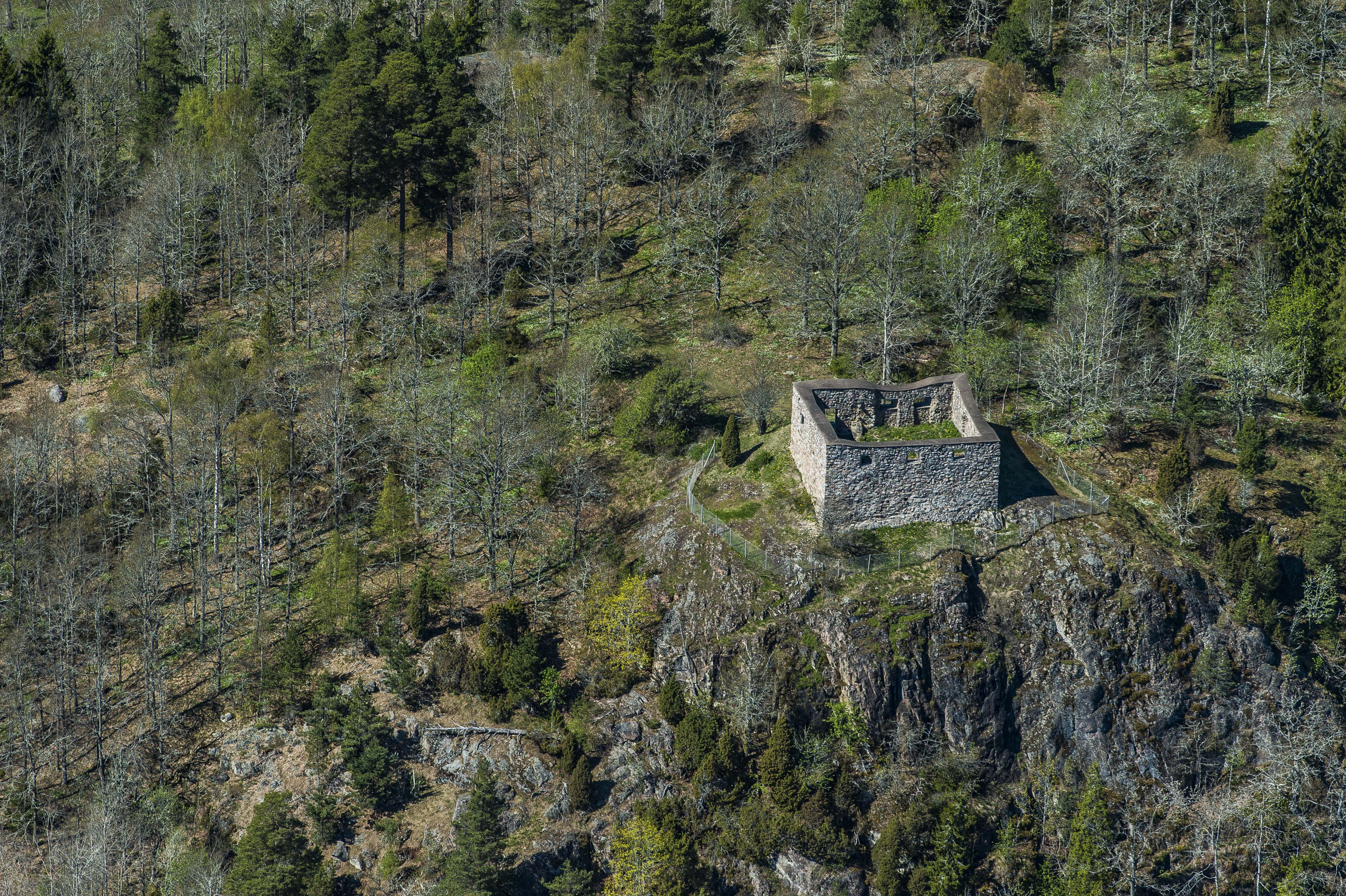

== History ==
Per Brahe the Younger acquired Näs manor in 1659 and on its grounds, Brahälla was founded in 1680. The walling was handled by Måns mason from Hultbäcken in Bälaryd parish. The building was constructed with shell walls. In 1681, nails were purchased for chipping the roof, which shows that the roof was covered with wood shingle. However, the builder Per Brahe died already in the autumn of 1680, after which the castle was transferred to the crown during the reduction decided by the 1680 Riksdag.

Brahälla was built one-floored with an antechamber, a large hall and three smaller chambers. The building also had a basement floor and a terrace on the roof, like Brahehus.

In his description of Småland in 1770, Samuel Rogberg writes that Brahälla " is still roofed and walls preserved" . In a dom book from 1795, it is said that farmers from Skog stole bricks from the building. In 1802, the sources show that the castle is still intact. The roof was blown down into the lake sometime before 1857 during a storm. After this, the building was more exposed to the effects of the weather.

In 1864, Nils Månsson Mandelgren visited the ruin and found all the walls intact, with the exception of the northern one, where the portion above a window had collapsed.

The ruin underwent restorations in 1930–1932, 1961 and 2010.
