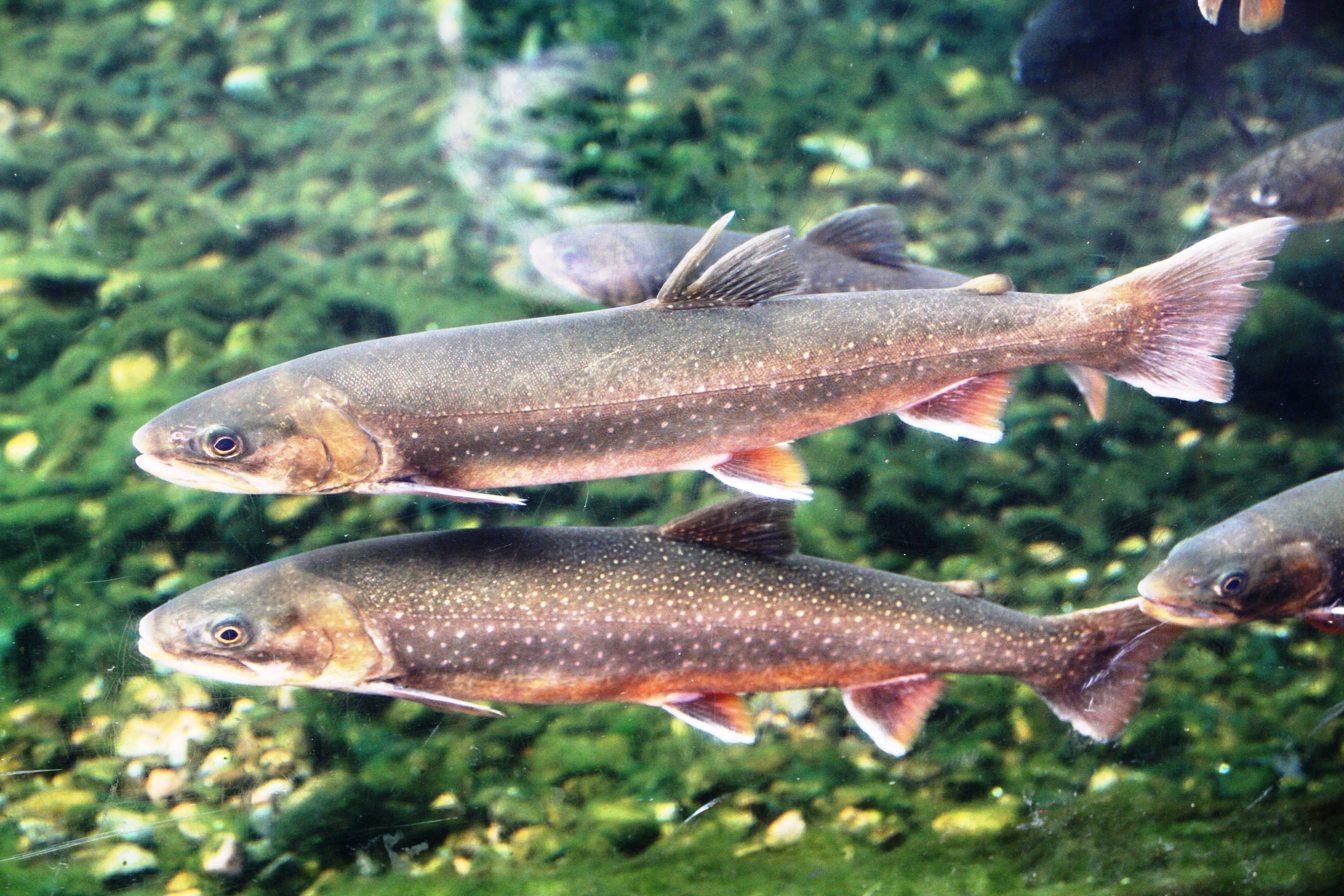
- Salvelinus umbla

Conservation status
- Least Concern (IUCN 3.1)

Scientific classification
- Kingdom: Animalia
- Phylum: Chordata
- Class: Actinopterygii
- Order: Salmoniformes
- Family: Salmonidae
- Genus: Salvelinus
- Species: S. umbla

Binomial name
- Salvelinus umbla (Linnaeus, 1758)

Synonyms
- Salmo umbla Linnaeus, 1758; Salmo salvelinus Linnaeus, 1758; Salvelinus salvelinus (Linnaeus, 1758)

= Salvelinus umbla =

Species of fish

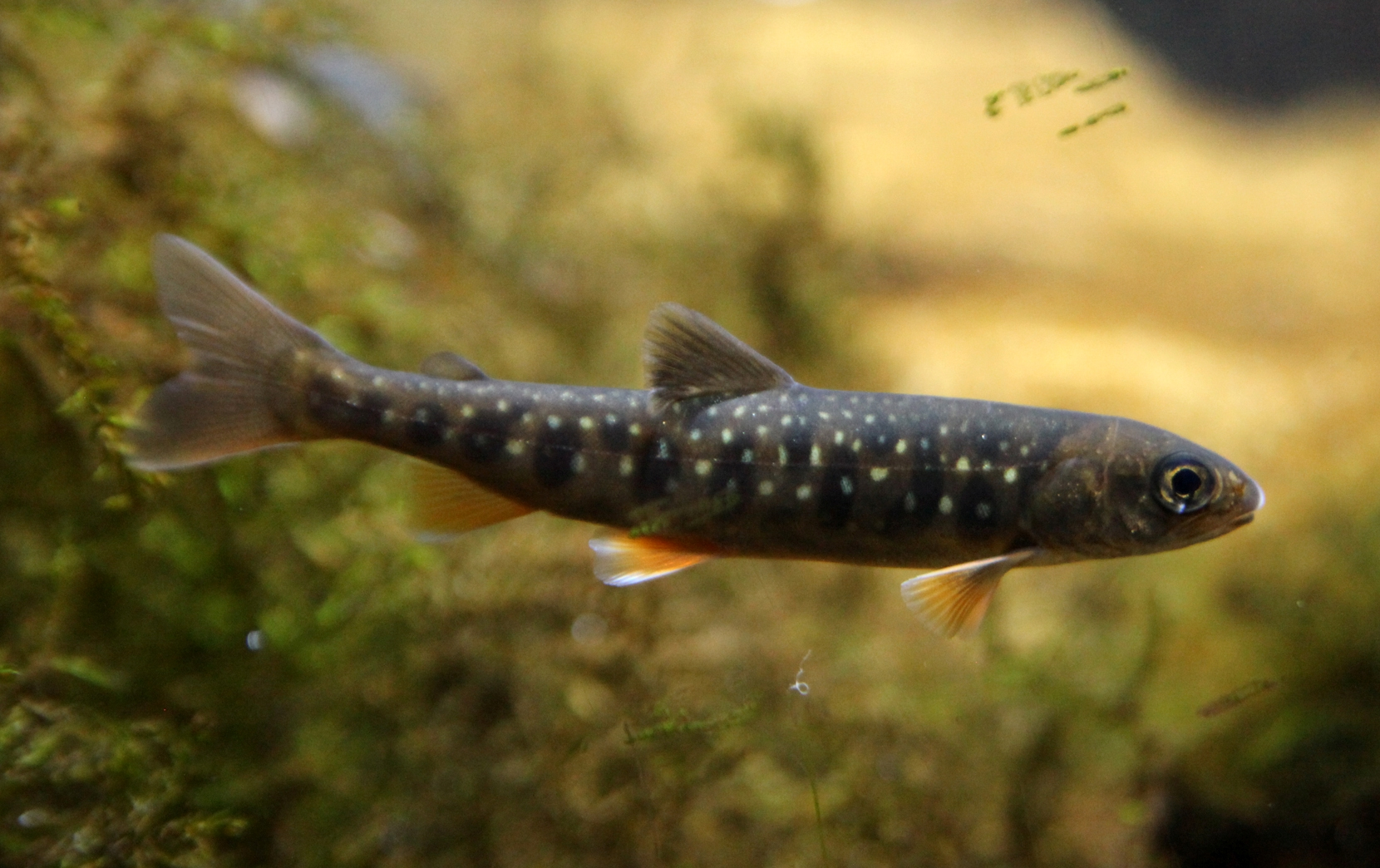
Juvenile

Salvelinus umbla, also known as lake char, is a species of char found in certain lakes of the region of the Alps in Europe.

This char species usually inhabits the deeper waters of the lakes, feeding on crustaceans, insects and benthic fauna. Larger specimens can be piscivores. They look for areas with pebbly or stony bottom on steep slopes, at depths between 30 and 120 m during the spawning season.

== Distribution ==
This char species lives in alpine and subalpine glacial valley lakes of central Europe, between France and Austria and between Germany and Northern Italy. It has been introduced in high altitude lakes as well.

Although it is assessed as a least concern species by IUCN, the eutrophication of the lakes in the Subalpine region, which began in the 1950s and peaked in 1979, badly affected Salvelinus umbla populations, which crashed during that period. The lake char became locally extinct in lakes such as Mondsee and other char species, such as Salvelinus profundus, were driven to extinction in the same period. Currently, however, most lake char populations are gradually recovering.

The name Salvelinus umbla has also been used in Sweden of char populations of central parts of the country, referred to as storröding (large char) in distinction of the northern fjällröding ( = Salvelinus alpinus). These populations are not thought to be related to the Central European populations, rather storröding from Lake Sommen and Lake Vättern are closely related to the char of Lake Ladoga in Russia.
