= Vättern =

Second largest lake in Sweden

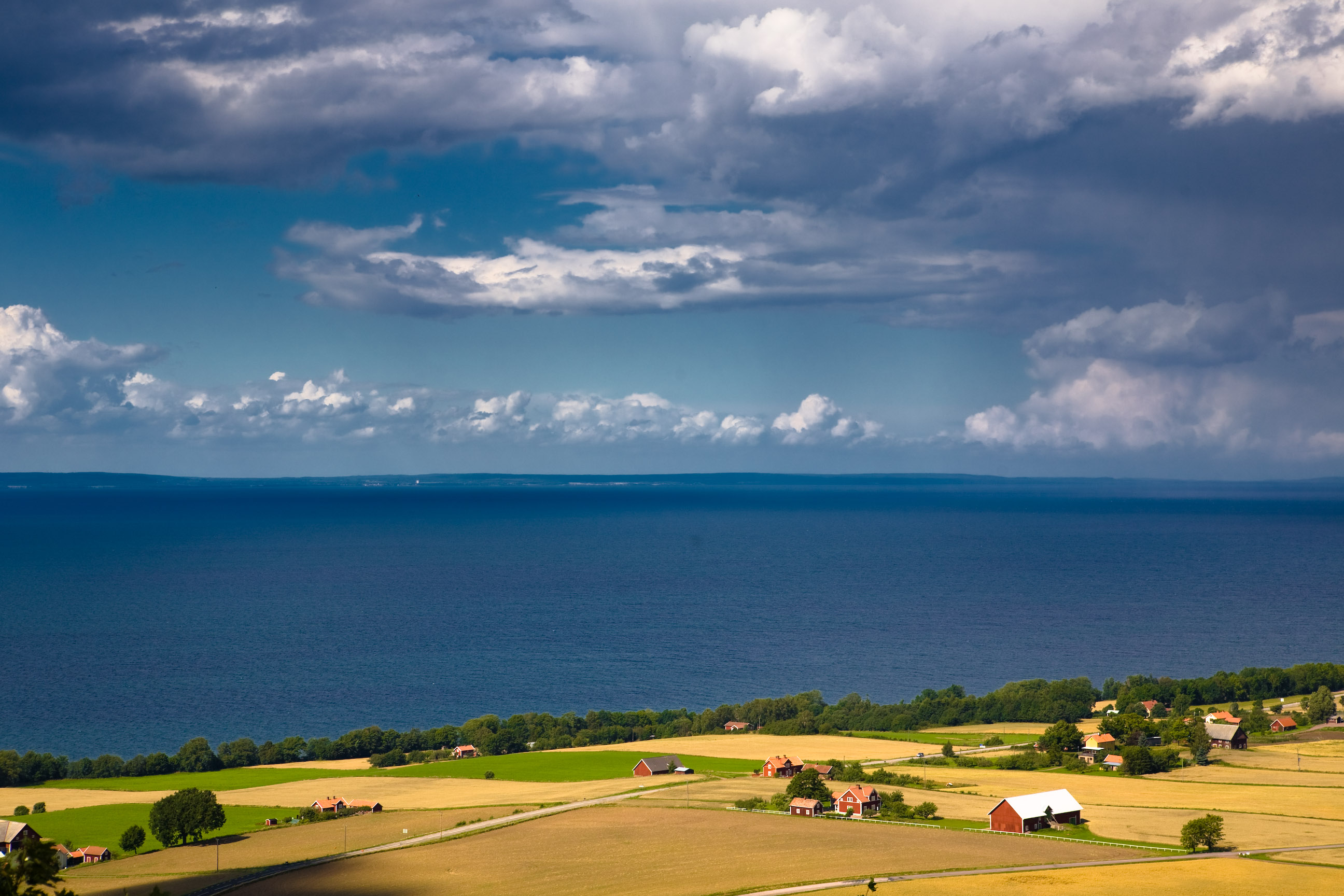
- West-to-east view of the lake including Visingsö in the foreground

- Location within Sweden
- Coordinates: 58°24′N 14°36′E
- Primary outflows: Motala ström
- Catchment area: 4,503 km^{2} (1,739 sq mi)
- Basin countries: Sweden
- Surface area: 1,912 km^{2} (738 sq mi)
- Average depth: 41 m (135 ft)
- Max. depth: 128 m (420 ft)
- Water volume: 77.0 km^{3} (18.5 cu mi)
- Surface elevation: 88 m (289 ft)
- Islands: Visingsö
- Settlements: Vadstena, Jönköping, Hjo, Askersund, Åmmeberg, Karlsborg, Motala

Vättern (/ˈvɛtərn/ VET-ərn, Swedish: [ˈvɛ̌tːɛɳ]) is the second-largest lake in Sweden, after Vänern, and the sixth-largest lake in Europe. It is a long, finger-shaped body of fresh water in south central Sweden, to the southeast of Vänern, pointing at the tip of Scandinavia. Vättern is a relatively deep lake, containing about half as much water as Vänern despite having only about a third of its surface area; its deepest point is 128 metres (420 ft) below the surface.

Vättern drains into Motala ström through Bråviken into the Baltic Sea, but since 1832 it has also had a downstream connection through the Göta Canal to Vänern and the Kattegat tributary of the Atlantic Ocean. The lake has plenty of sources from rivers and small lakes, with the highest located sources being near Nässjö on the South Swedish Highland near the southeastern shoreline.

== Name ==
The name Vättern is closely related to "vatten", the Swedish word for water, and also means "water, lake".

== Geography ==
Satellite picture of Vättern

The lake's total surface area is about 1,912 km^{2} (738 sq mi), with a drainage basin a little over double that, about 4,503 km^{2} (1,739 sq mi). The deepest known point, located to the south of the island of Visingsö, is 128 meters (420 ft). The average depth is 41 meters (135 ft). The lake has a perimeter of about 642 km (399 mi). The volume is 77.0 km^{3} (18.5 cu mi). These numbers tend to be fixed, as the level of the lake is regulated.

Situated in Götaland, the lake is drained by Motala ström, starting at Motala, and flowing ultimately through a controlled canal into the Baltic Sea. The lake includes the scenic island of Visingsö, located outside Gränna. Other towns on the lake include Vadstena, Jönköping, Hjo, Askersund, Åmmeberg and Karlsborg. It is bounded by the Provinces of Västergötland, Närke, Östergötland and Småland.

In the north there is a scenic but not mountainous inland fjord, Alsen. About 62% of the drainage basin is still covered with spruce, pine and deciduous forest. About 26.7% is dedicated to agriculture.

== Geology ==
While many of smaller lakes in southern Sweden are thought to have originated by glacial stripping of an irregular weathering mantle in the last 2.5 million years Vättern formed by tectonics as a graben 700 to 800 million years ago in the Neoproterozoic. Granitic basement rocks in the lake are deformed (foliated) by the Protogine Zone that crosses the area. The basin is partially filled by sedimentary rock of the Visingsö Group of Neoproterozoic age. This group include rocks such as conglomerate, sandstone, arkose and carbonates. The older of these sediments deposited before the Vättern came into existence as a graben. Acritarch microfossils such as Chuaria circularis are common in Visingsö Group.

During the most recent millions of years multiple glaciations have covered the lake and its surroundings, leaving glacial striations and drumlins as they receded.

The present-day lake began as an independent body of water left by the receding Scandinavian glacier after the last glacial period around 10,000 BP. It became a minor bay of the Baltic ice lake. Most of the lake's relict species (like the Arctic char) date from that time. Subsequently, it was a bay of Yoldia Sea and then became connected to Ancylus Lake, discharging from the north end of its extent. At about 8000 BP an accident of the uneven Scandinavian isostatic land rise brought Vättern above Ancylus and the two became distinct.

The annual post-glacial rebound today is 3.5 mm (0.14 in) in northeastern Motala and 2.6 mm (0.10 in) in southern Jönköping. This means that Vättern is tilting to the south by 1 mm (0.039 in) every year.

== Biology ==
The lake contains both phytoplankton and zooplankton, such as Copepoda and Cladocera. The benthos species include Crustacea, Oligochaeta, Diptera and Bivalvia. In addition are several species of fish, including Salvelinus salvelinus, Coregonus lavaretus and Salmo salar. The lake is known for its Vättern char, as it is called, Salvelinus alpinus. The Vättern char is genetically close to the Sommen char in nearby Lake Sommen and chars of Lake Ladoga in Russia.

== Uses ==
=== The lake ===
Vättern has been famous for the excellent quality of its transparent water. Many of the municipalities in the area receive their drinking water directly from Vättern. The lake water requires very little treatment before being pumped into the municipal systems and the natural, untreated water can be safely drunk from almost any point in the lake. It has been suggested that Vättern is the largest body of potable water in the world. The surrounding municipalities process 100% of their sewage.

Vättern is known for the annual recreational cycling race Vätternrundan, attracting some 20,000 participants to finish the 300 km trip around the shores of the lake.

Vättern is also noted for its fishing, serving people in the nearby districts. Tourist sport fishermen and vacationers are free to fish in the lake as long as they do not use nets. The lake is also used for commercial fishing.

=== The drainage basin ===
A number of industries provide employment in the drainage basin: mining, manufacturing, forestry and paper. Agriculturalists raise cattle, sheep, swine and poultry.

=== Cultural notes ===
According to the Catholic Church, Saint Catherine of Vadstena performed a miracle involving three people in peril on lake ice.

Thomas Nashe mentions this lake (Lake Vether) in his Terrors of the Night (published 1594), although he mistakenly locates the lake in Iceland:

Admirable, above the rest, are the incomprehensible wonders of the bottomless Lake Vether, over which no fowl flies but is frozen to death, nor any man passeth but he is senselessly benumbed like a statue of marble.

All the inhabitants round about it are deafened with the hideous roaring of his waters when the winter breaketh up, and the ice in his dissolving gives a terrible crack like to thunder, whenas out of the midst of it, as out of Mont-Gibell, a sulphureous stinking smoke issues, that wellnigh poisons the whole country.

Lake Vether is also mentioned in Samuel Johnson's essay for The Idler No. 96, on Hacho of Lapland.

John Bauer, his wife Ester and their three-year-old son, Bengt, drowned in the sinking in bad weather of the steamer Per Brahe on the lake on the night 19 November 1918.

== See also ==
- Lakes of Sweden
