= Joint valley landscape =

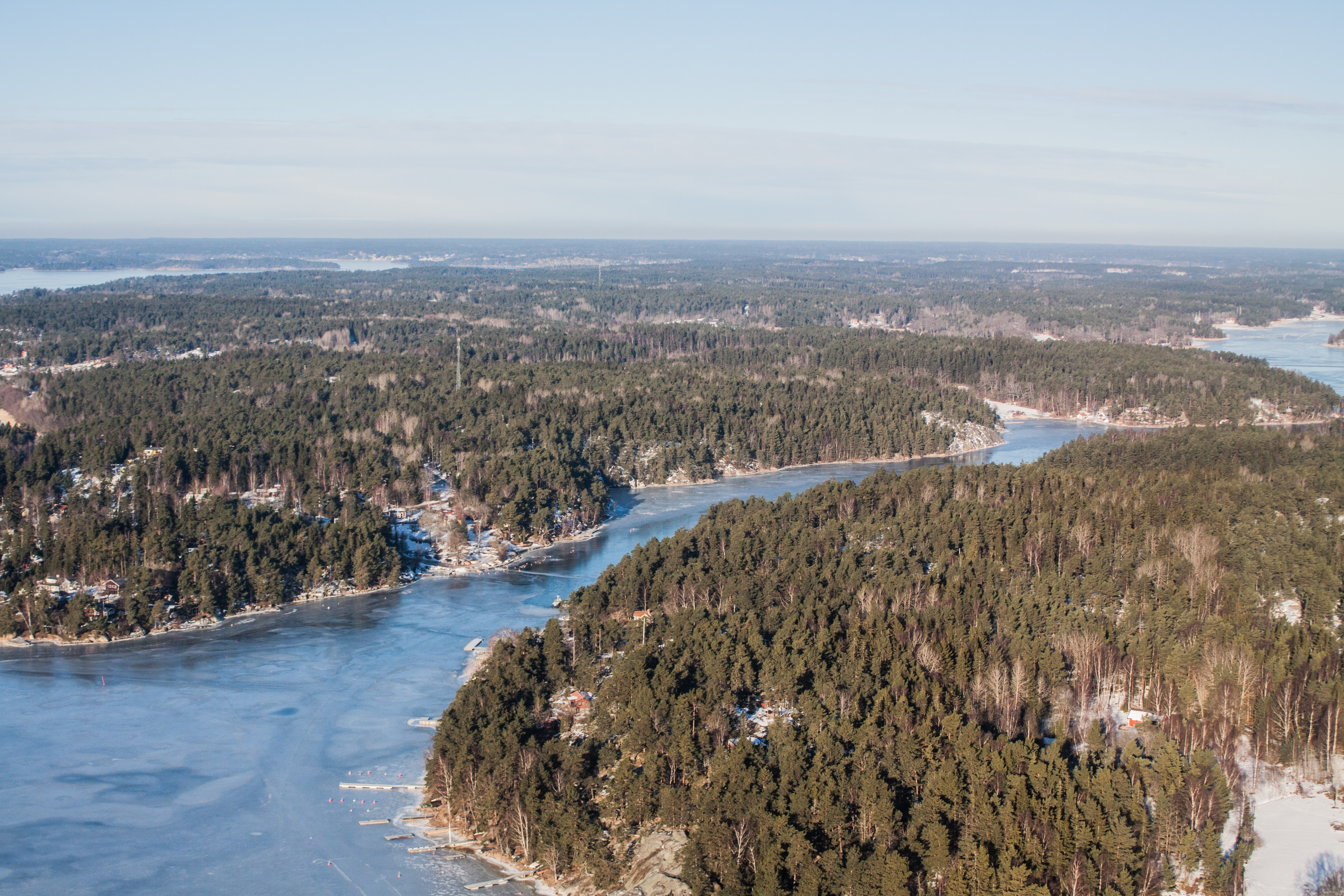
Joint valley terrain seen in wintertime Stockholm archipelago.

Joint valley landscape or fissure valley terrain (Swedish: sprickdalslandskap, sprickdalsterräng) is a type of relief common in Fennoscandia. The landscape originates from the erosion of joints in the bedrock which leaves behind small plateaus or ridges in between. When the block summits in joint valley landscapes are of different height it may indicate the past movement of a vertical geological fault.

Karna Lidmar-Bergström identified joint valley landscape areas centered on Blekinge, Bohuslän, Linköping/Västervik, Stockholm and Hudiksvall. In the last three areas the flat summits of the landscapes are parts of the Sub-Cambrian peneplain. In addition to this there is a large-scale joint valley landscape that extends from the High Coast inland. The landscape type was first identified by Sten De Geer who in 1926 called it rutplatåland (literally, 'square plateau land'). Joint valley landscapes are among the few places in southern Sweden where there are steep slopes in excess of 25°.

== Gallery ==
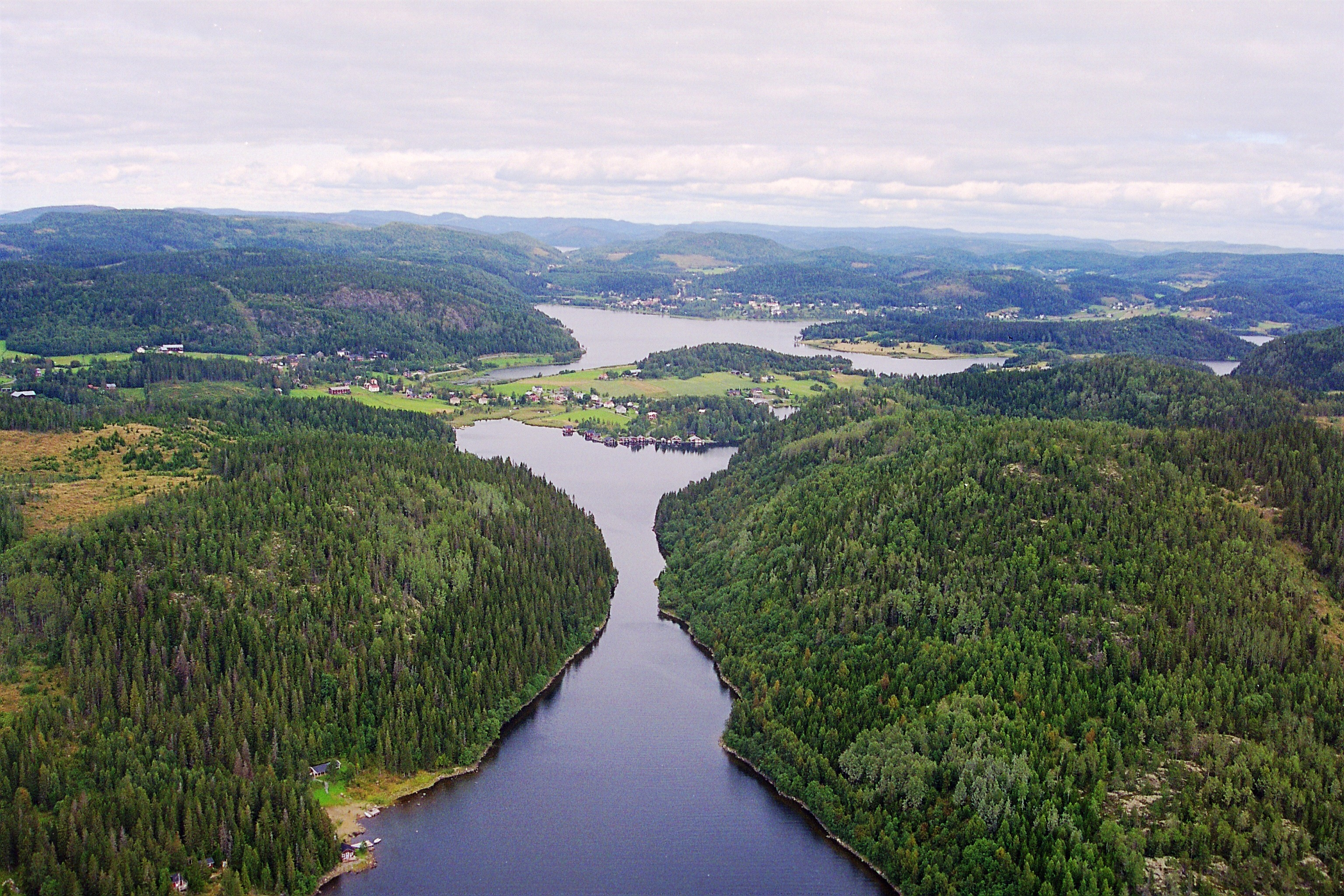
Large scale joint valley landscape at The High Coast, Ångermanland.

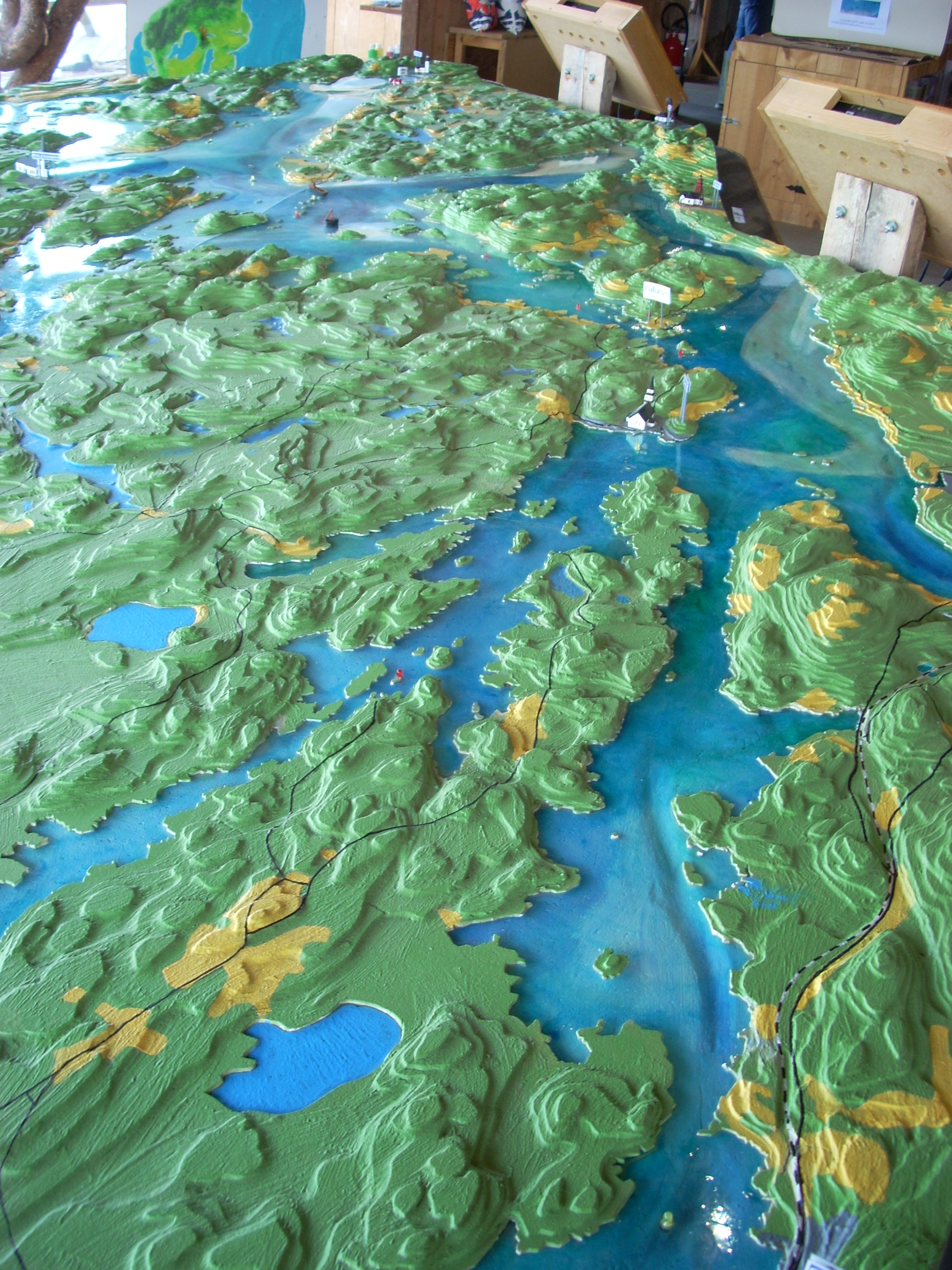
Model of the joint valley landscape around lake Sommen in naturum Sommen.
