= Sommen, Sweden =

Sommen
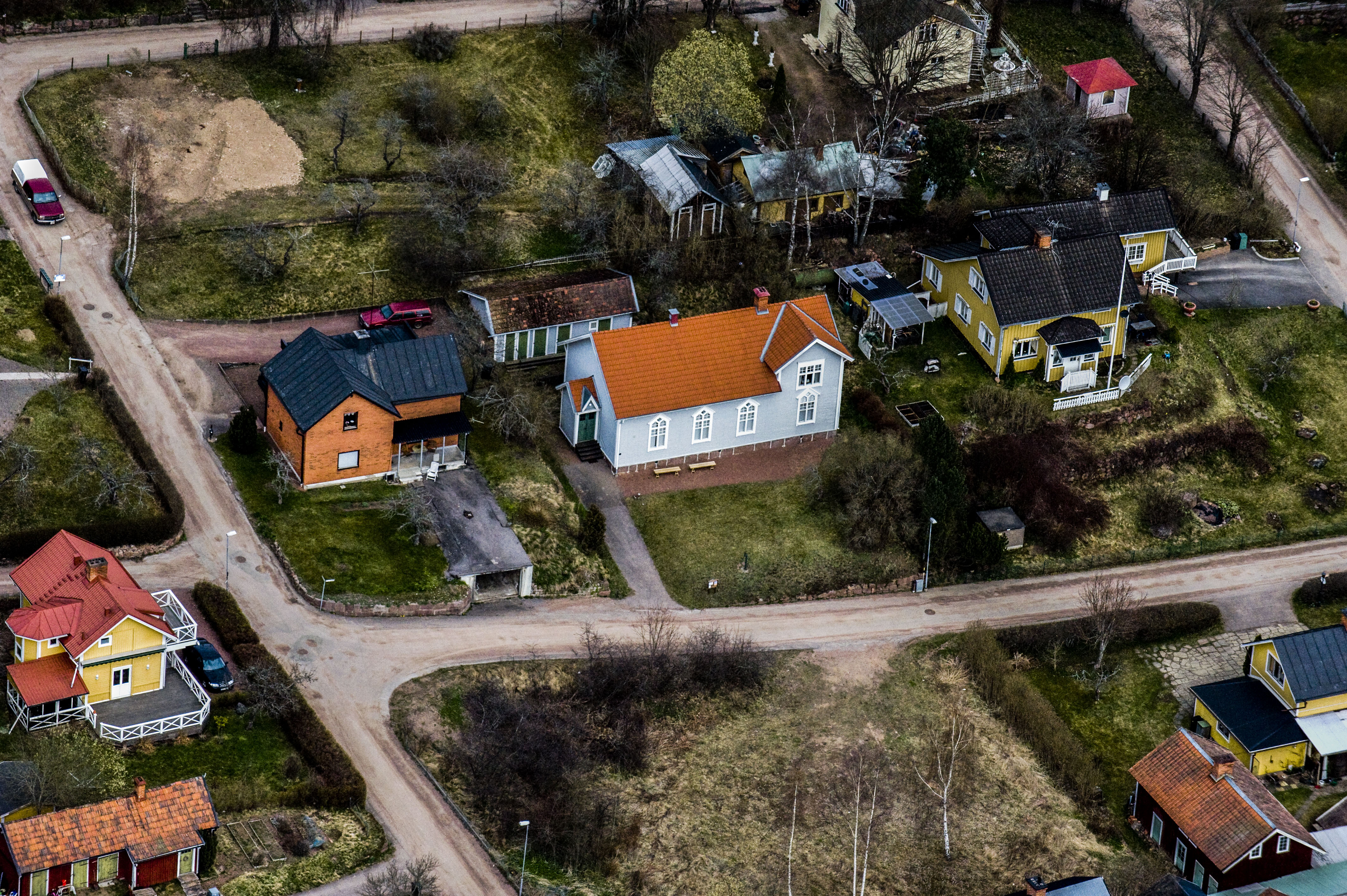

- Location within Jönköping Location within Sweden
- Coordinates: 58°08′N 14°58′E
- Country: Sweden
- Province: Småland
- County: Jönköping County
- Municipality: Tranås Municipality

Area
  - Total: 1.29 km^{2} (0.50 sq mi)

Population (31 December 2010)
  - Total: 772
  - Density: 598/km^{2} (1,550/sq mi)
- Time zone: UTC+1 (CET)
  - Summer (DST): UTC+2 (CEST)

Sommen is a locality situated in Tranås Municipality, Jönköping County, Sweden with 772 inhabitants in 2010. It is located at the northwestern end of the lake with which it shares its name.
