= Blåvik =

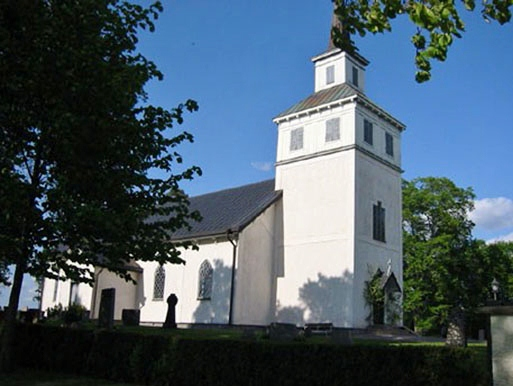
- Blåvik church

- Location within Östergötland Location within Sweden
- Coordinates: 58.06°N 15.062222°E
- Country: Sweden
- County: Östergötland
- Municipality: Boxholm
- Time zone: UTC+1 (CET)
  - Summer (DST): UTC+2 (CEST)

Blåvik is a village in Boxholm Municipality, Östergötland County. It lies in the traditional province of Östergötland at the northern shores of Lake Sommen. According to Svenskt ortnamnslexikon the name of the locality is first attested in 1307 as Blawijk, meaning not the ordinary blue color but "dark blue" and "dark". This is likely a reference to color of the lake embayment at place.
