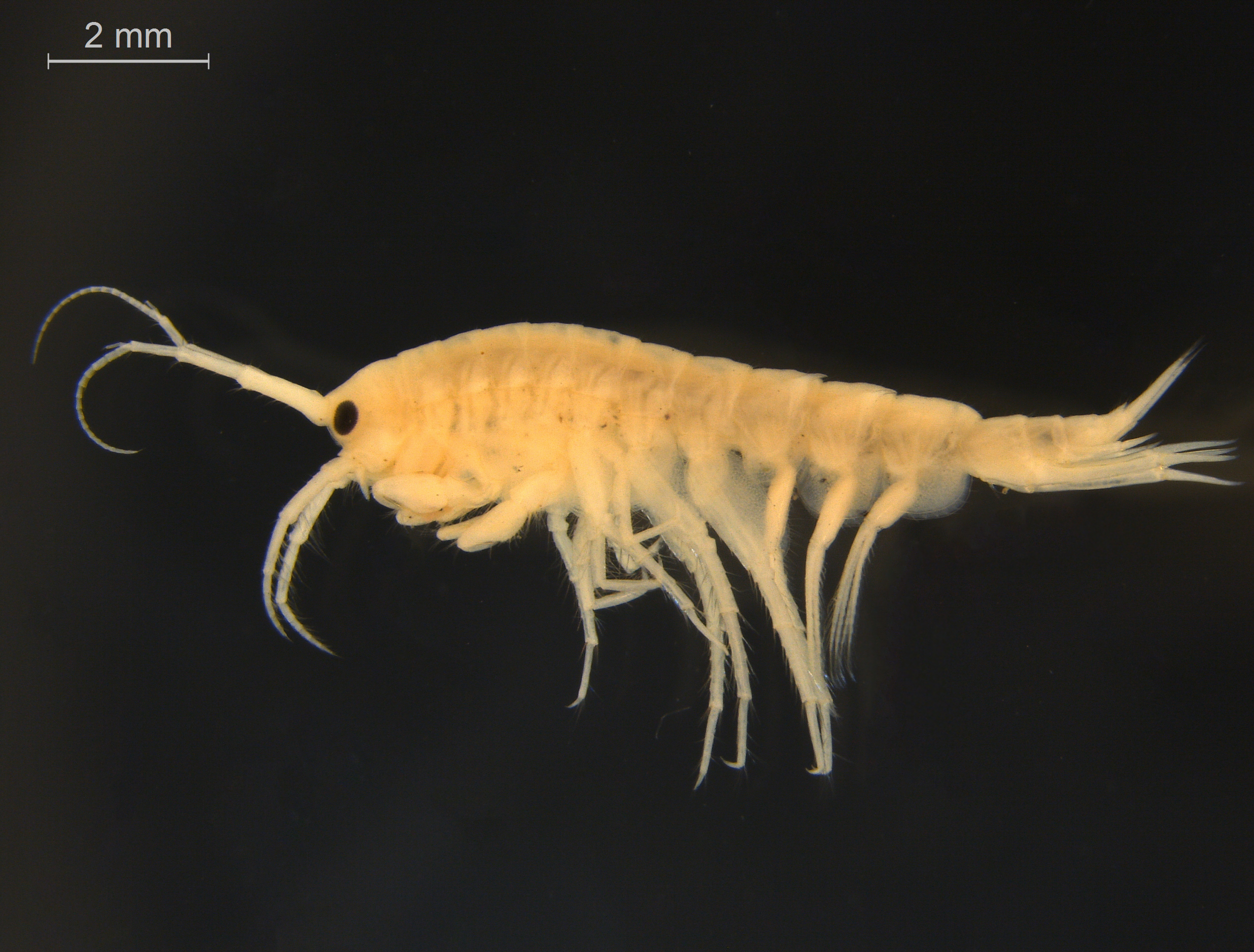

Scientific classification
- Kingdom: Animalia
- Phylum: Arthropoda
- Class: Malacostraca
- Order: Amphipoda
- Family: Pallaseidae
- Genus: Pallaseopsis
- Species: P. quadrispinosa

Binomial name
- Pallaseopsis quadrispinosa (Sars, 1867)

= Pallaseopsis quadrispinosa =

Species of crustacean

Pallaseopsis quadrispinosa is a species of crustacean belonging to the family Pallaseidae.

It is native to Northern Europe.

Synonym:

- Pallasea quadrispinosa Sars, 1867 (= basionym)
