= Naturum Sommen =

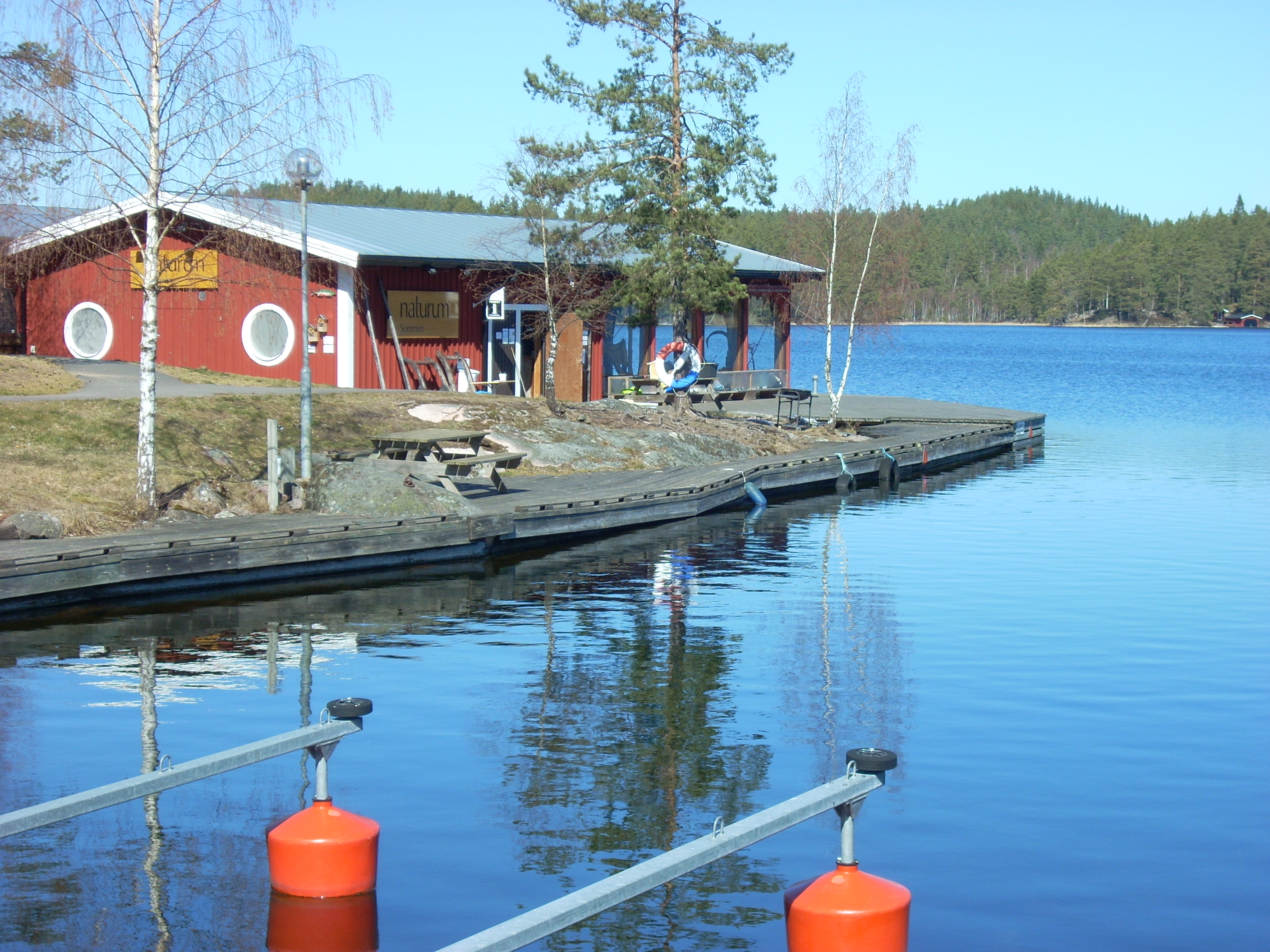
- Established: 2002; 23 years ago
- Location: Torpön, Ydre, Sweden
- Coordinates: 58°01′45″N 15°05′20″E
- Type: Nature center
- Website: sommen-naturum.se

Naturum Sommen is a visitor center and natural history museum located in Torpön Island in Lake Sommen in the South Swedish highlands. The building is modelled after a traditional boathouse. The idea of a nature museum was first conceived in 1996 and the museum was inaugurated in 2002. It was supported by the local history society of Torpön (Swedish: Torpöns hembygsförening) until late 2013, when the funds ran out. It reopened in 2014. Since 2017, it is run by the Ydre municipality.

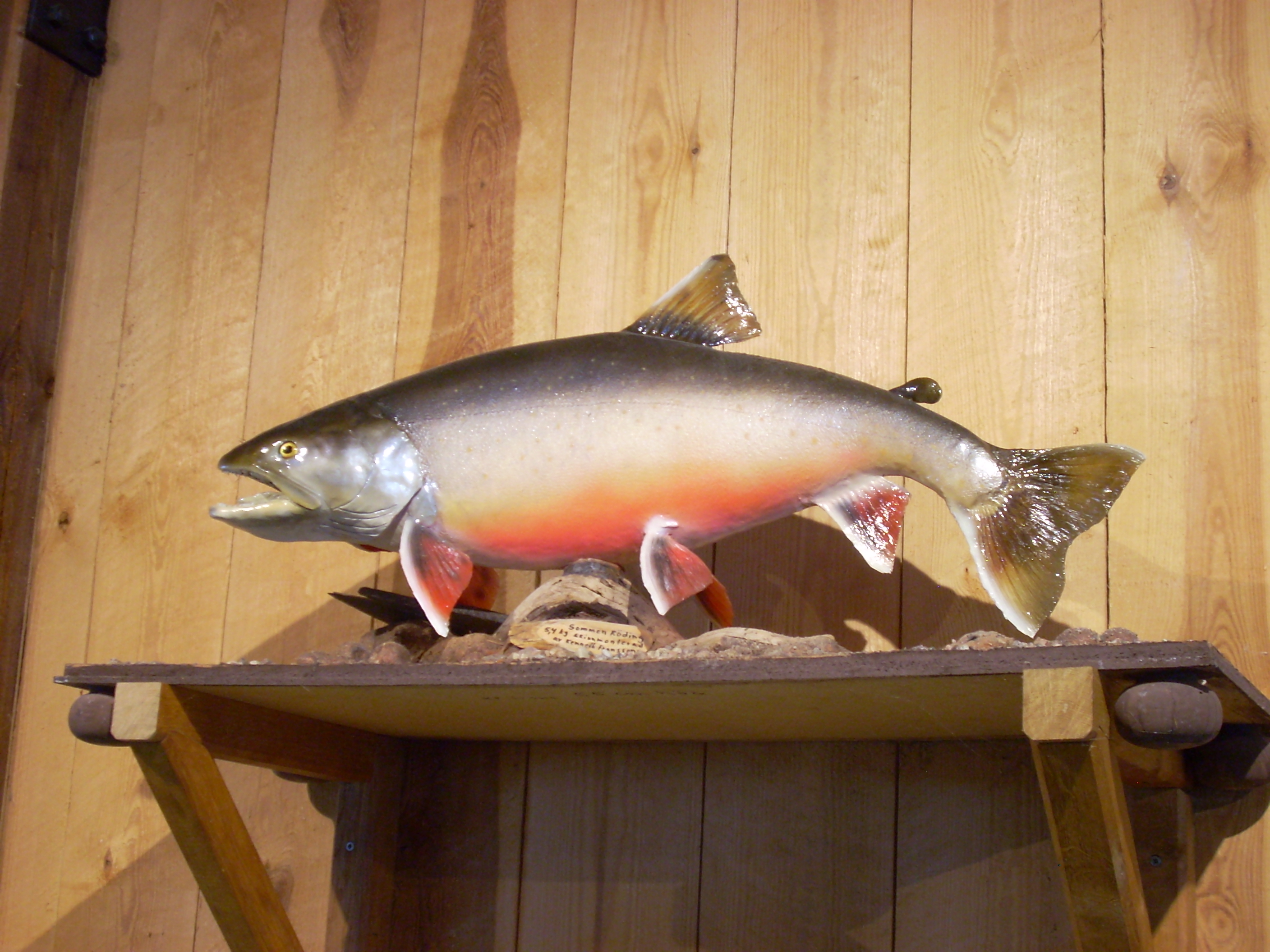
Real size model of a Sommen charr in naturum Sommen.

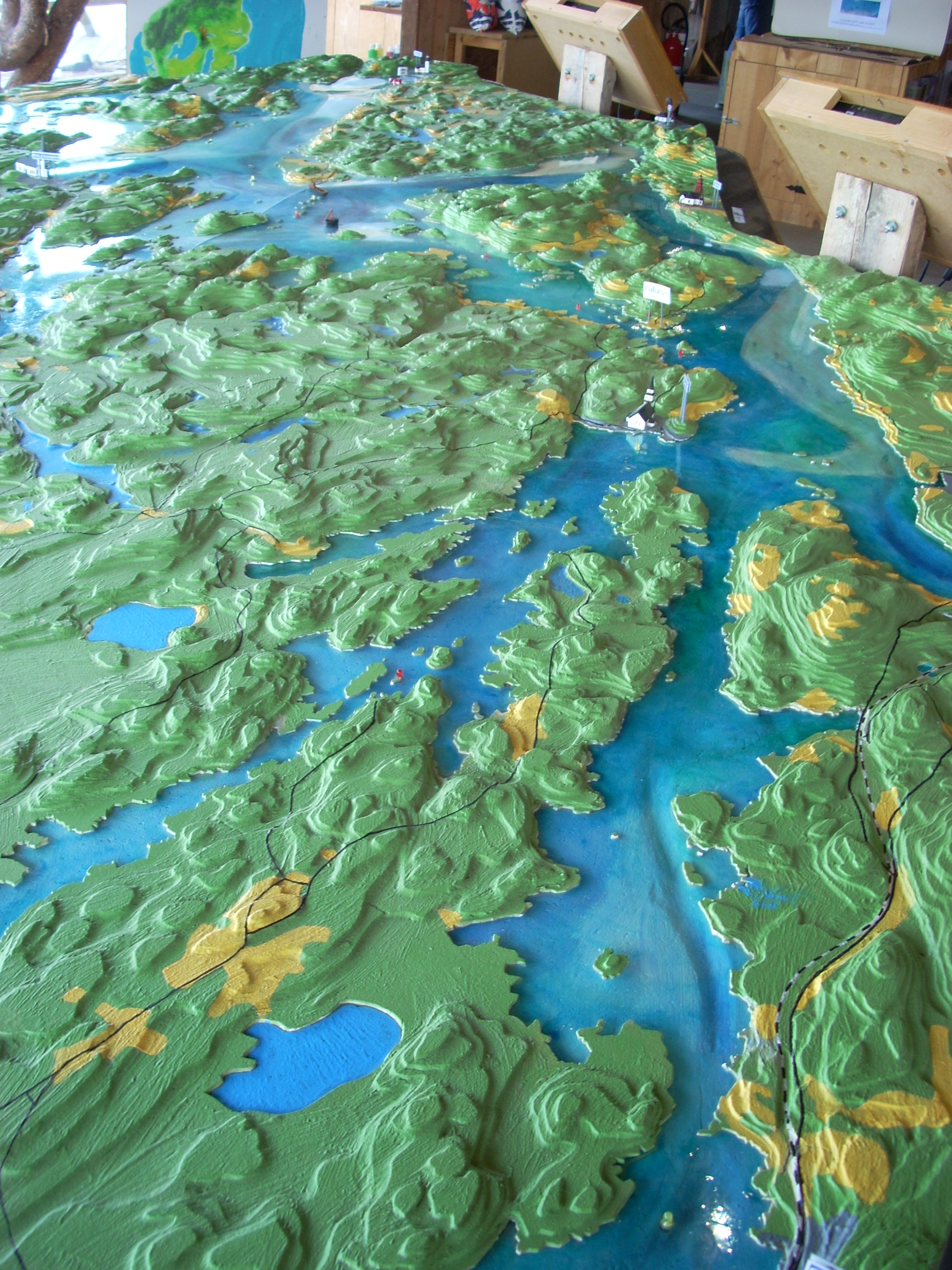
Model of lake Sommen.
