= Drögen =

Lake in Sweden

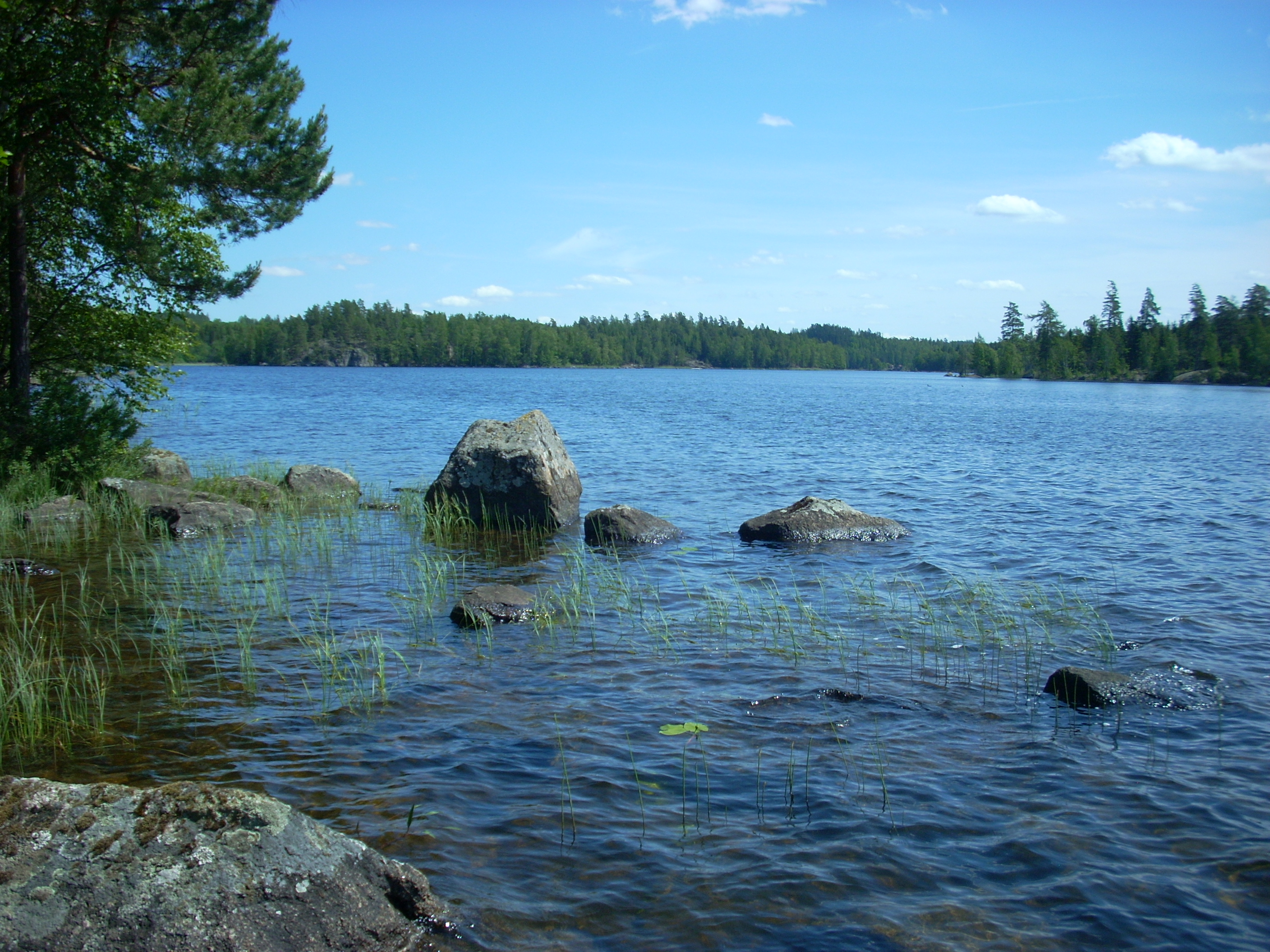
- Partial view of the southwestern part of Drögen

- Location within Östergötland
- Location: southern Sweden
- Coordinates: 58.10956°N 15.51937°E
- Primary inflows: Drillaån
- Primary outflows: Jonsboån
- Basin countries: Sweden
- Surface area: 8.85 km^{2} (3.42 sq mi)
- Max. depth: c. 40 m (130 ft)
- Shore length^{1}: 53.3 km^{2} (20.6 sq mi)
- Surface elevation: 155.2 m (509 ft)
- ^{1} Shore length is not a well-defined measure.

Drögen is a lake in Kinda and Linköping municipalities, Östergötland County in southeastern Sweden. The lake lies in sparsely populated area and is mostly surrounded by forests. Common fish in the lake are Eurasian perch, northern pike, common bleak, vendace, burbot, tench, common bream and roach. Occasionally European eel can be found while the local population of Arctic char (Swedish: storröding) has gone extinct.
