= Glacial relict =

Population of a cold-adapted species remaining after its glacier habitat has receded

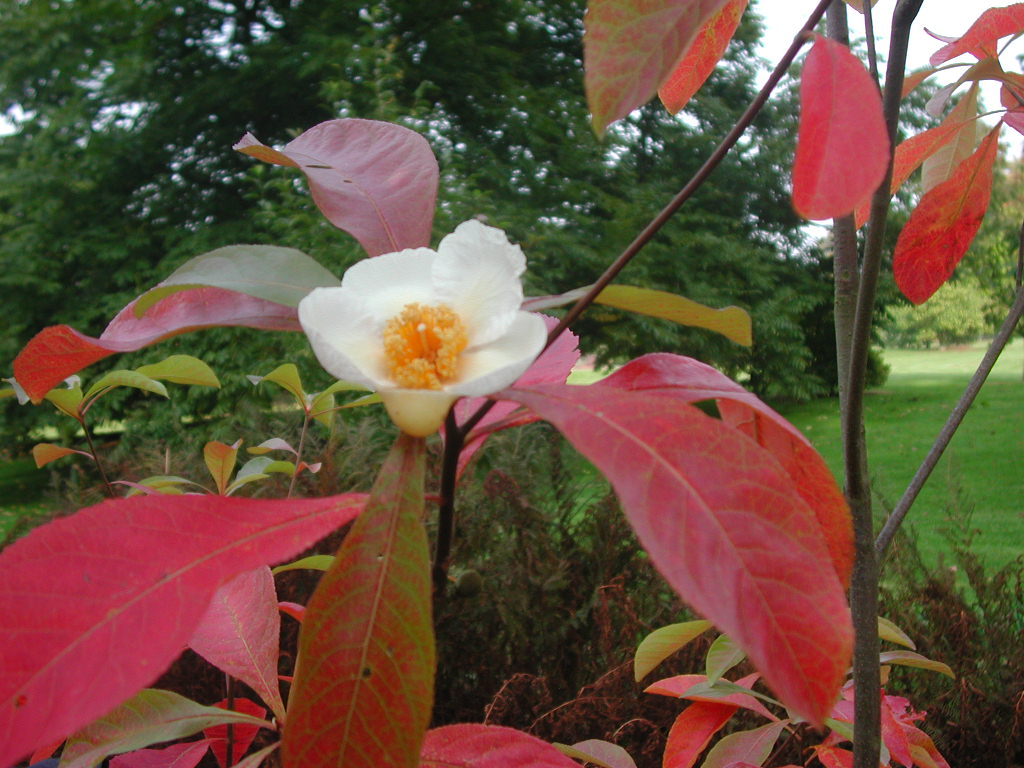
The Franklin tree is an example of a glacial relict species from the Southeastern USA. It went extinct in the wild in the early 19th century due to a changing climate, inability to spread outside of its limited range, and limited environmental tolerance. The species survives today as a cultivated garden plant.

A glacial relict is a population of a species that was common in the Northern Hemisphere prior to the onset of glaciation in the late Tertiary that was forced by climate change to retreat into refugia when continental ice sheets advanced. They are typically cold-adapted species with a distribution restricted to regions and microhabitats that allow them to survive despite climatic changes.

== Examples ==
There are a wide variety of plant species which fit the category of glacial relict. The ones given here are a small selection of the much larger group.

- A tall deciduous tree genus, Liriodendron, was widespread across temperate regions of the Northern Hemisphere until the onset of continental glaciations. The genus took refuge in southeast Asia and southeast North America, expanding to occupy today's temperate habitats. The east-west orientation of mountains in Europe is thought to be the geographic barrier that prevented the genus from migrating far enough southward to avoid extinction.
- The biogeography of various aquatic species deemed glacial relicts that are found in Lake Sommen is likely related to a different geography during the early history of the lake. One theory claims that aquatic species were transferred from the Baltic Ice Lake through a natural lock system in connection with a temporary advance of the ice-front during the Younger Dryas. On land, the unusual occurrence of dwarf birch near Sund is also judged to be a leftover from a cold geological past.
- The Franklin tree (Franklinia alatamaha) was a glacial relict in the American Southeast and endemic to the Altamaha River valley in Georgia before going extinct in the wild in the early part of the 19th century. Like various other plants in this region of the United States, it grew in a lowland glacial refuge. Due to changing temperatures in the Holocene, it was unable to survive - it likely originally dispersed as seeds floating down the Altamaha River, but due to the nature of rivers, it was unable to make the reverse journey to cooler upland climes and survive rising temperatures. This species was the subject of a number of enthusiastic searches to locate potential wild populations in the 20th century, but it was never found in the wild after its original extinction and reintroduction efforts in the early 21st century failed.
- Examples of other endemic plants in the Southeastern USA which were limited by the same environmental factors include the Florida torreya, the Florida yew, and the now-extinct Critchfield spruce.

== See also ==
- Biodiversity hotspot
- Ecological island
- Last Glacial Maximum refugia
- Nunatak hypothesis
- Rapoport's rule
- Relict (biology)
- Sky island
- Wrangel Island (home to last population of mammoths)
