= El Capitan (Idaho) =

Mountain in the state of Idaho

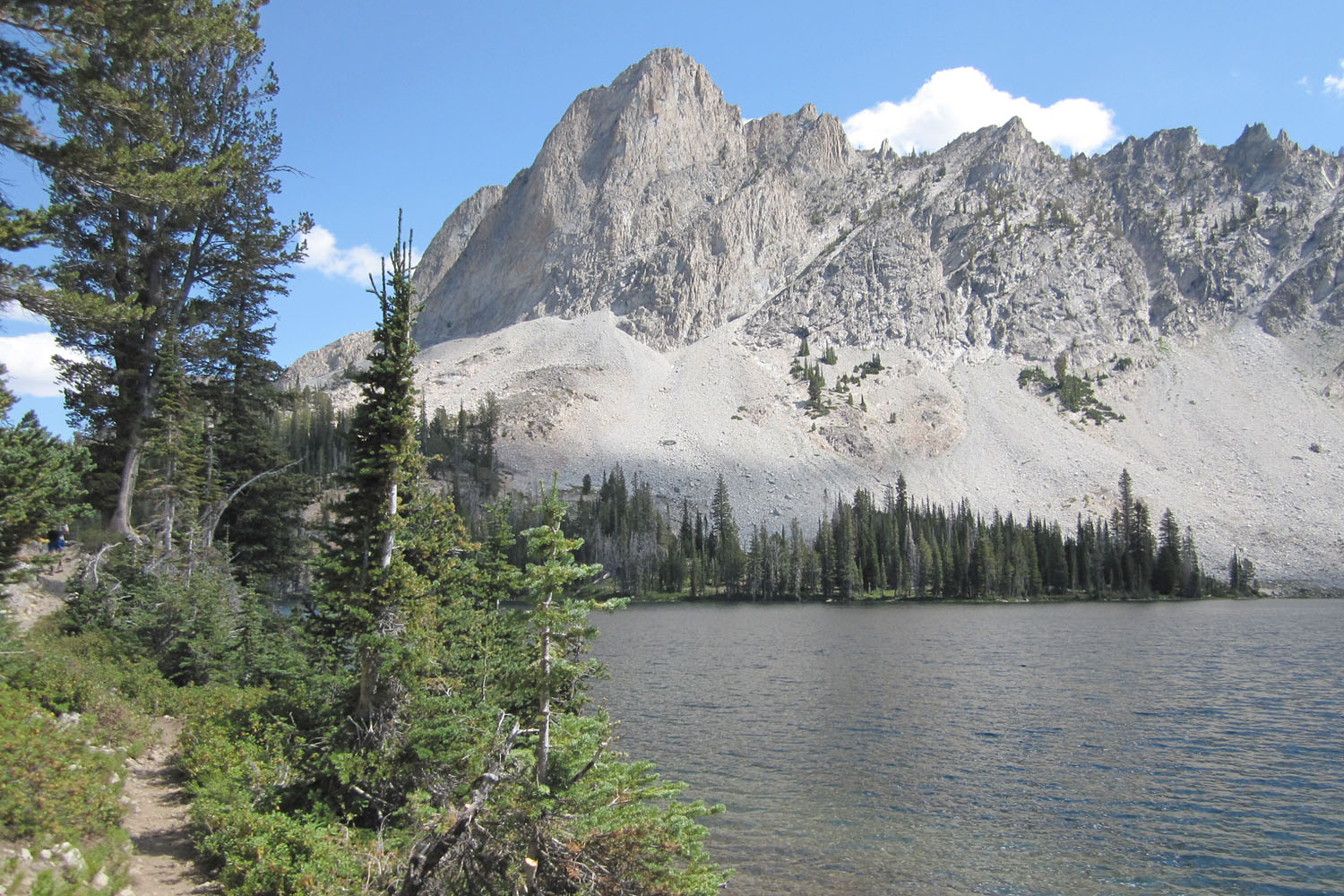
- El Capitan and Alice Lake

Highest point
- Elevation: 9,901 ft (3,018 m)
- Prominence: 437 ft (133 m)
- Parent peak: Peak 10,052
- Coordinates: 43°56′28″N 114°56′02″W

Geography
- Location within the United States Location within Idaho
- Location: Blaine County, Idaho, U.S.
- Parent range: Sawtooth Range
- Topo map: USGS Snowyside Peak

Climbing
- Easiest route: Scrambling, class 3

El Capitan (9,901 feet (3,018 m)) is a mountain in the western United States, in the Sawtooth Range of central Idaho. Located in the Sawtooth Wilderness of Sawtooth National Recreation Area in Blaine County, it is 1.2 miles (1.9 km) south-southeast of Peak 10,052, its line parent.

El Capitan is 1.9 miles (3.1 km) east of Snowyside Peak and 1.4 miles (2.3 km) west of McDonald Peak. It rises above the eastern end of Alice Lake, with a surface elevation of 8,600 feet (2,620 m) above sea level, accessed by the moderate trail from Pettit Lake at 7,000 feet (2,130 m).

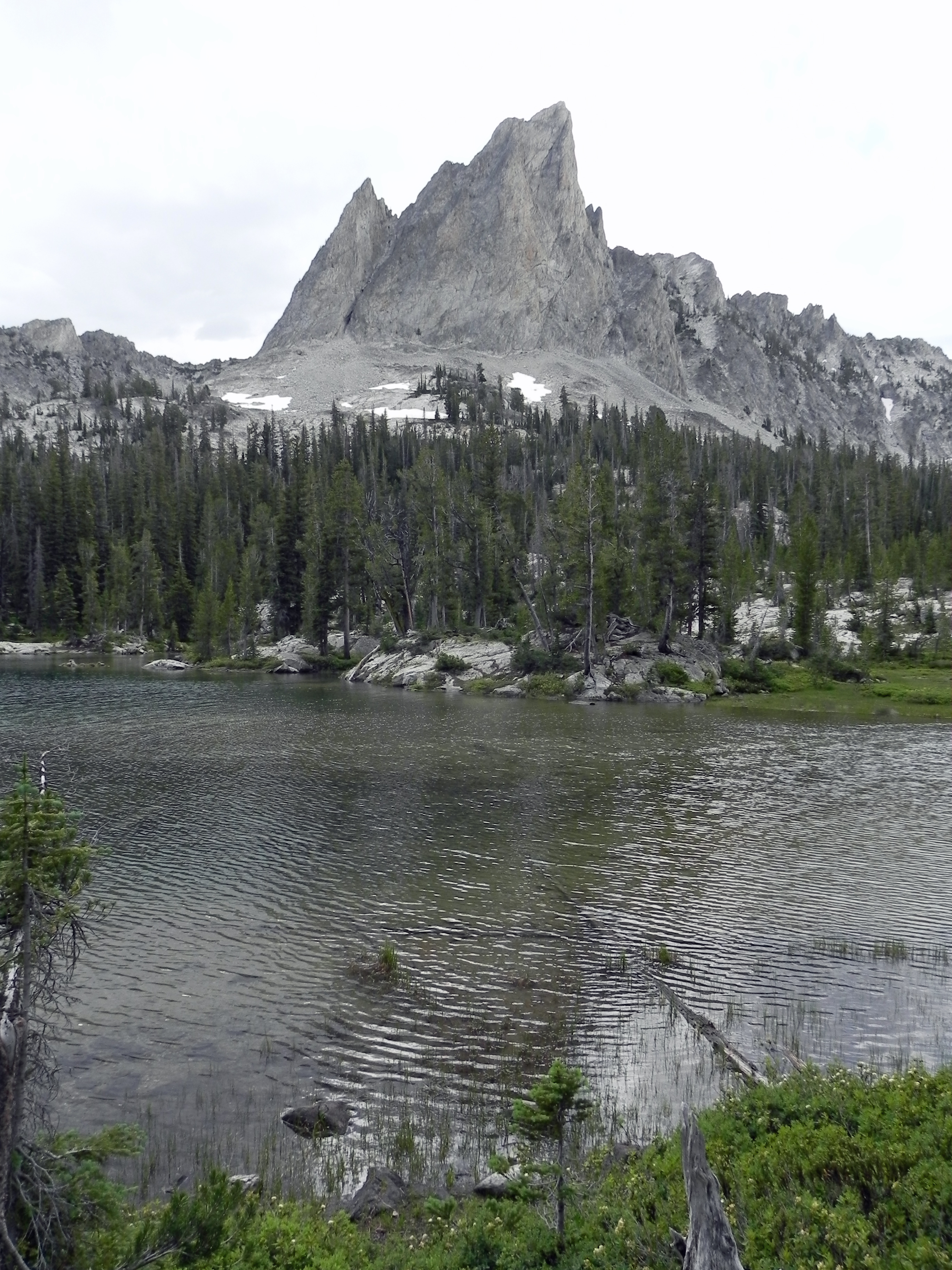
El Capitan
