= Imogene Peak =

Mountain in Idaho, United States

- Location within Idaho

Highest point
- Elevation: 10,125 ft (3,086 m)
- Prominence: 845 ft (258 m)
- Parent peak: Parks Peak
- Coordinates: 43°59′37″N 114°56′07″W

Geography
- Location: Custer County, Idaho, U.S.
- Parent range: Sawtooth Range
- Topo map: USGS Snowyside Peak

Climbing
- Easiest route: Scrambling, class 3

Imogene Peak, at 10,125 feet (3,086 m) above sea level is a peak in the Sawtooth Range of Idaho. The peak is located in the Sawtooth Wilderness of Sawtooth National Recreation Area in Custer County. The peak is located 1.83 mi (2.95 km) north of Parks Peak, its line parent. Farley Lake is located south of the peak, and Imogene Lake is west of the peak.
