= McDonald Peak (Blaine County, Idaho) =

Mountain in the state of Idaho

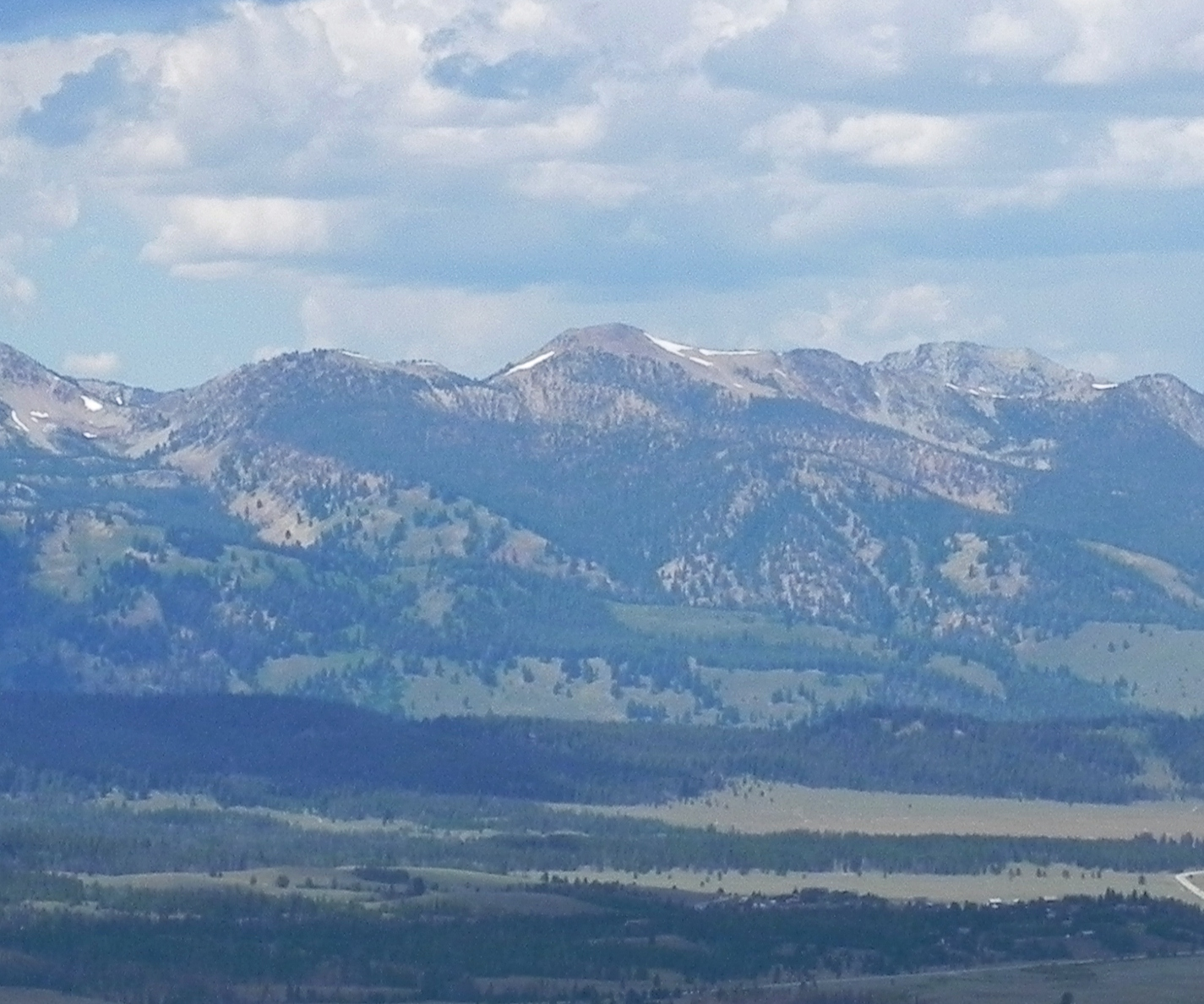
- McDonald Peak at center from Galena Summit

Highest point
- Elevation: 10,068 ft (3,069 m)
- Prominence: 828 ft (252 m)
- Parent peak: Mount Cramer
- Coordinates: 43°56′47″N 114°54′23″W

Geography
- Location within Idaho
- Location: Blaine County, Idaho, U.S.
- Parent range: Sawtooth Range
- Topo map: USGS Snowyside Peak

Climbing
- Easiest route: Scrambling, class 3

McDonald Peak, at 10,068 feet (3,069 m) above sea level is a peak in the Sawtooth Range of Idaho. The peak is located in the Sawtooth Wilderness of Sawtooth National Recreation Area in Blaine County. The peak is located 1.93 mi (3.11 km) southeast of Parks Peak, its line parent. It is southwest of Pettit Lake.
