= Virvasselva =

River in Nordland, Norway

Virvasselva (Norwegian); Virvassåga (Norwegian); Vijriesjohke (Southern Sami); Viresjåhkå (Lule Sami)
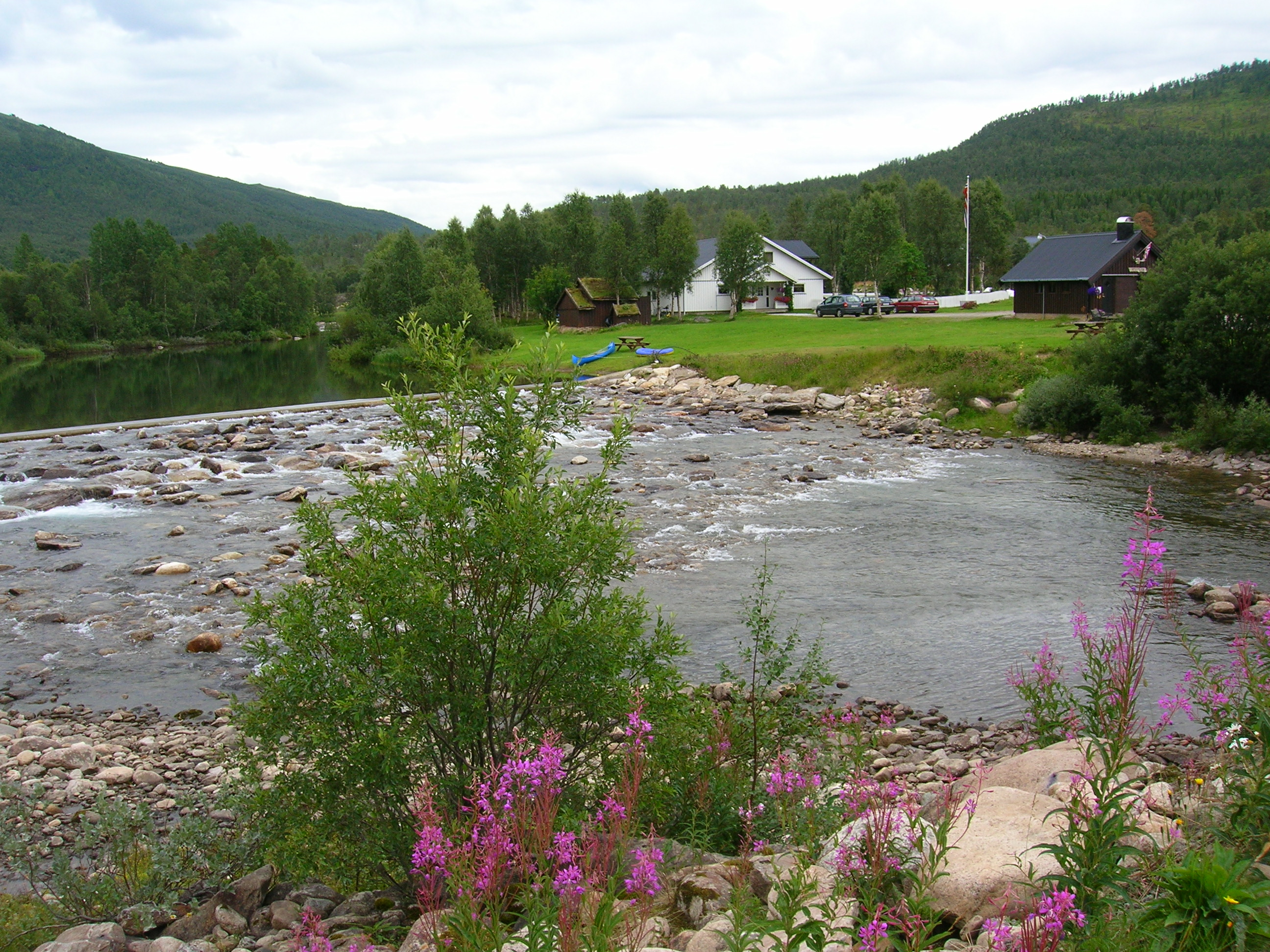
- Interactive map of the river

Location
- Country: Norway
- County: Nordland
- Municipalities: Rana Municipality

Physical characteristics
- Source: Virvatnet
  - location: Rana Municipality, Norway
  - coordinates: 66°18′36″N 15°24′12″E
  - elevation: 645 metres (2,116 ft)
- Mouth: Ranelva
  - location: Rana Municipality, Norway
  - coordinates: 66°26′48″N 15°07′54″E
  - elevation: 319 metres (1,047 ft)
- Length: 21 km (13 mi)

Basin features
- Progression: Ranelva

Virvasselva or Virvassåga (Norwegian), Vijriesjohke (Southern Sami), or Viresjåhkå (Lule Sami) is a river in Rana Municipality in Nordland county, Norway. The river flows out of the eastern part of the lake Virvatnet. The stream Boneselva meets Virvasselva about 1 kilometre (0.62 mi) east of the lake Virvatnet. This is a large, continuous, very rich and untouched wetland area with tarns, rivers, marshes, and very tight vegetation. Virvasselva has a good population of Arctic char.

After about 5 kilometres (3.1 mi), the river Virvasselva reaches a pumping station where most of the water is diverted through a tunnel to flow west to supply the Rana power station. The much smaller river then continues north and meets the main river Ranelva at Elvmøtheia in the Dunderland Valley.

== Media gallery ==
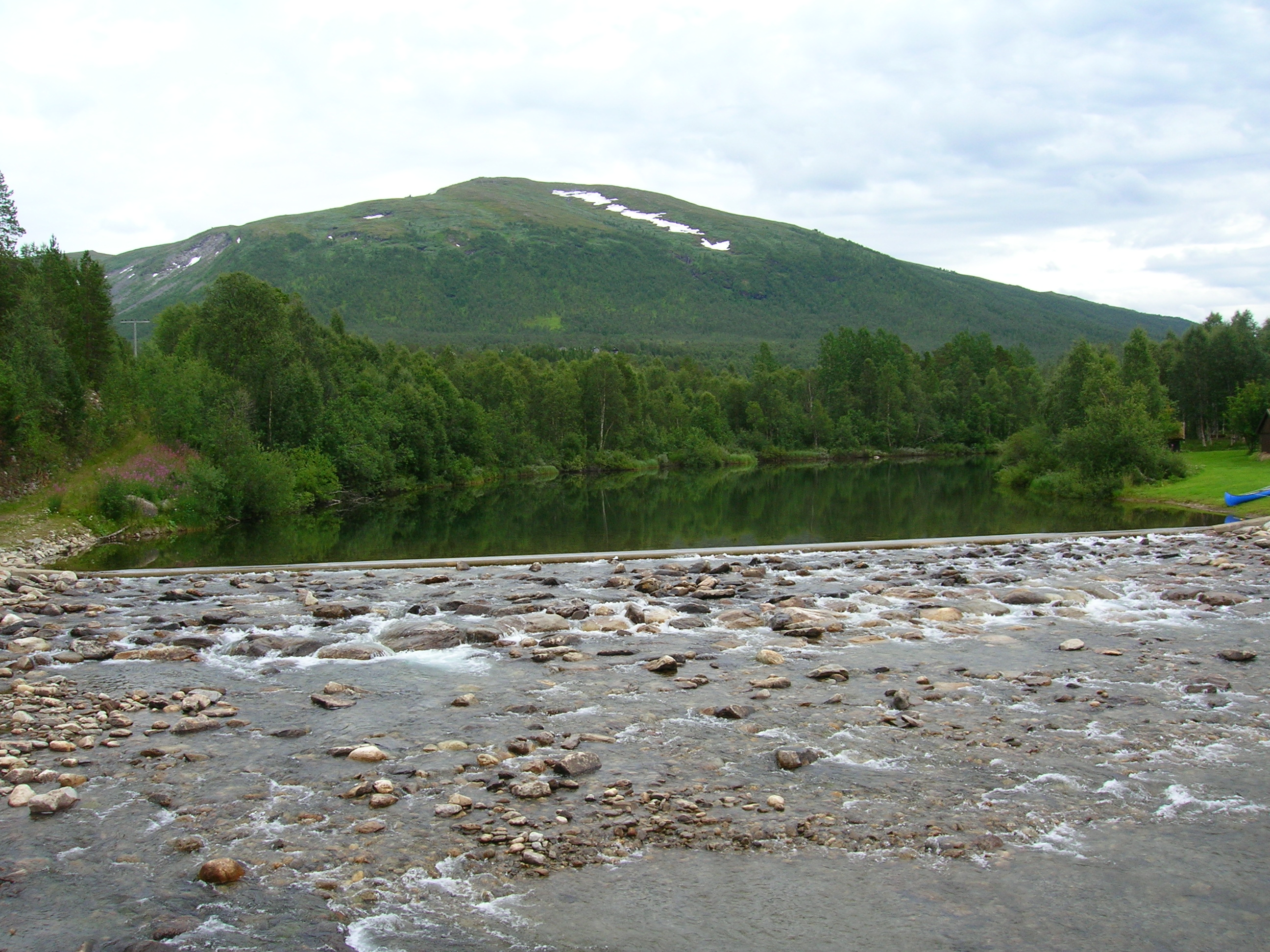
The lowest part of Virvasselva

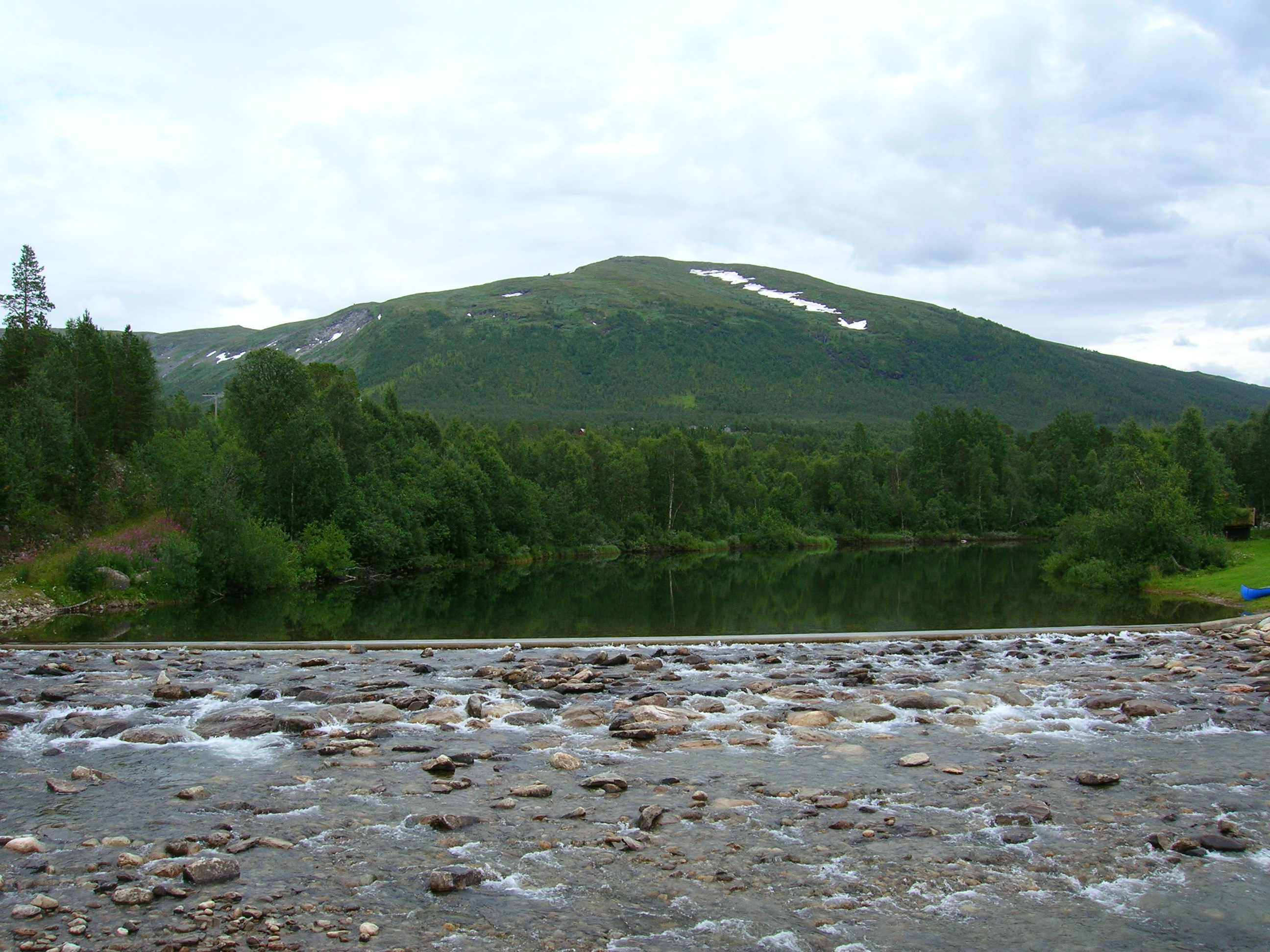
The lowest part of Virvasselva

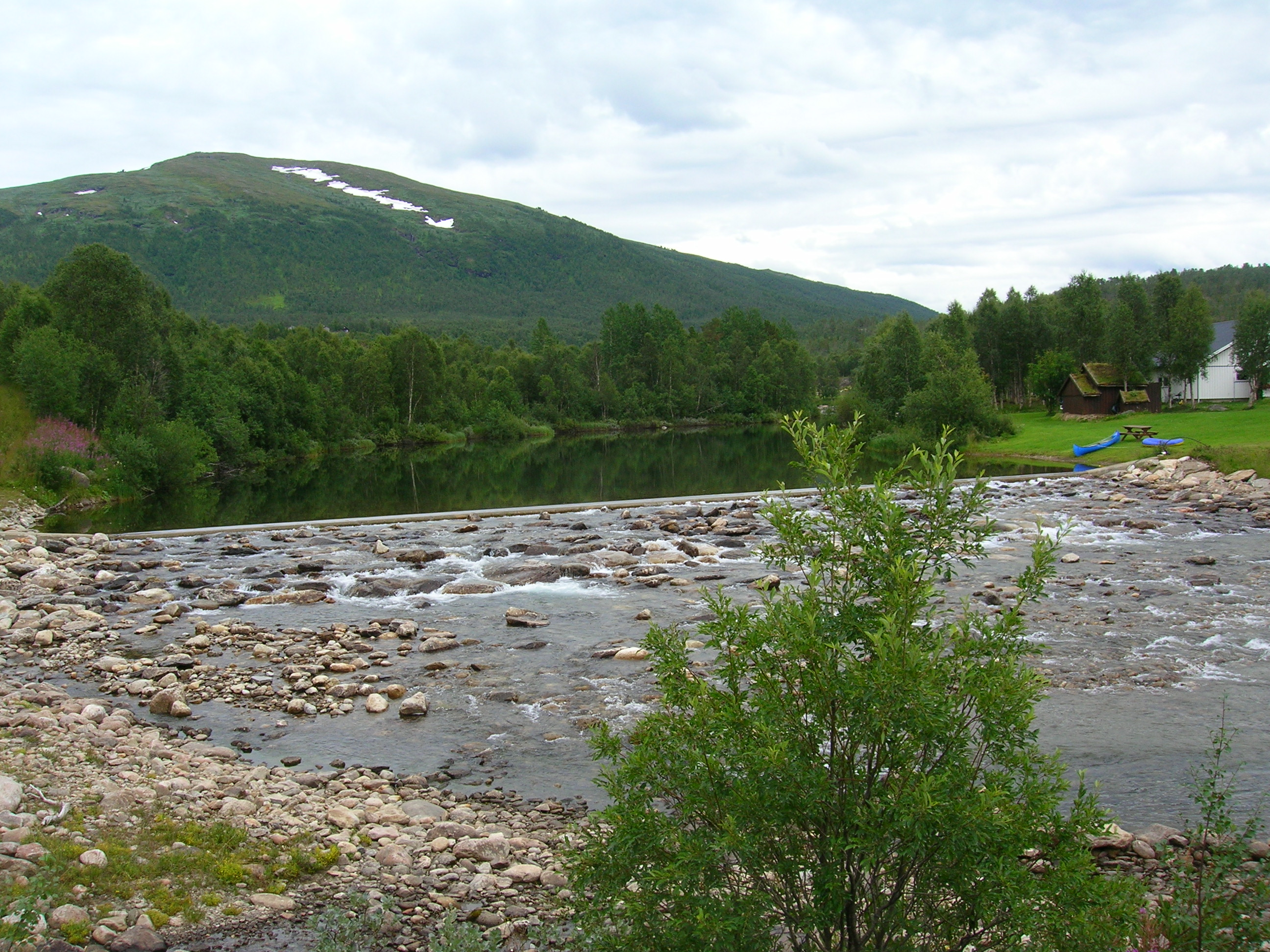
The lowest part of Virvasselva

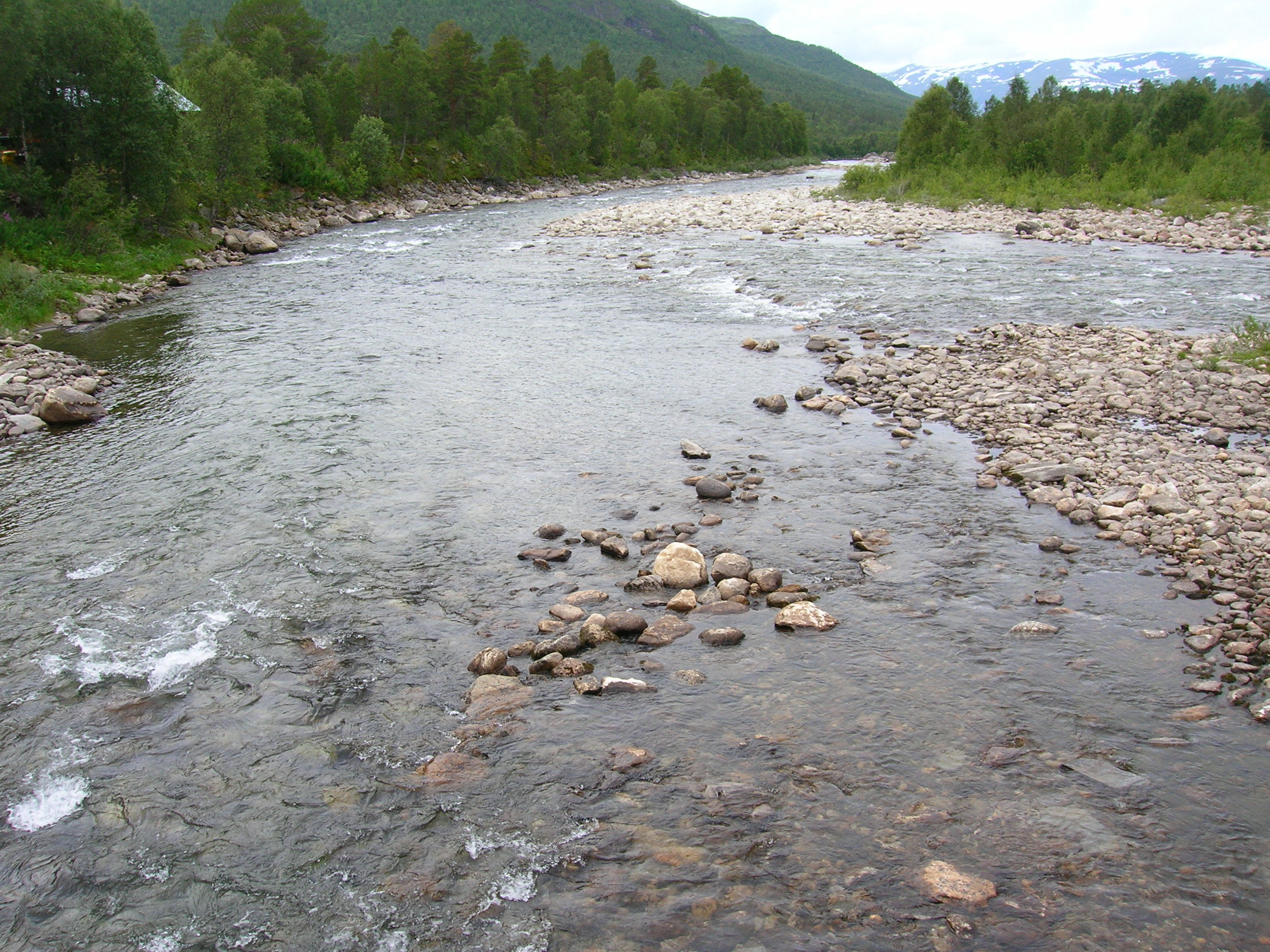
Virvasselvas meeting with Ranelva (on the right)

== See also ==
- List of rivers in Norway
