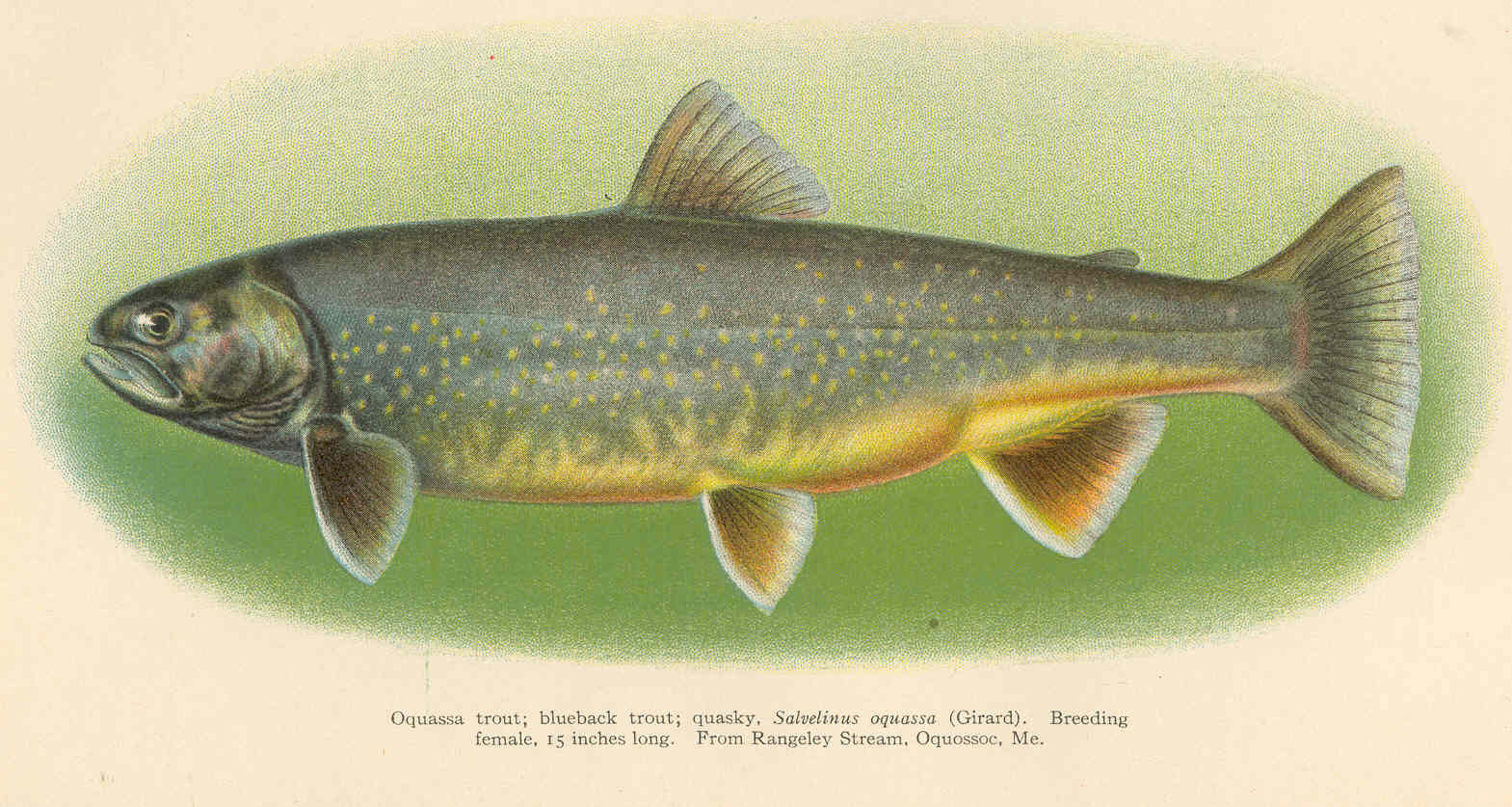

Conservation status
- Vulnerable (NatureServe)

Scientific classification
- Kingdom: Animalia
- Phylum: Chordata
- Class: Actinopterygii
- Order: Salmoniformes
- Family: Salmonidae
- Genus: Salvelinus
- Species: S. alpinus
- Subspecies: S. a. oquassa

Trinomial name
- Salvelinus alpinus oquassa (Girard, 1854)

Synonyms
- Salvelinus oquassa Girard 1854; Salvelinus alpinus aureolus Bean, 1887

= Sunapee trout =

Subspecies of fish

The Sunapee trout (Salvelinus alpinus oquassa), also called blueback trout, Sunapee Golden trout, or Quebec red trout, is a putative subspecies of Arctic char native to northeastern New England in the United States, as well as Québec and New Brunswick in Canada, with introduced populations in Idaho.

== Taxonomy ==
It was originally described as three separate species: S. oquassa, the blueback trout of Lake Oquassa in Maine (1854), S. aureolus the golden trout of Sunapee lake in New Hampshire (1888), and S. marstoni the Quebec red trout (1893). DNA analysis done in the latter half of the twentieth century on museum specimens of the Sunapee lake strain of the Sunapee golden trout found that all lacustrine populations of Arctic char in north eastern North America have been isolated from each other for near equal amounts of time, indicating that there is no special, distinguishing characteristics between the Sunapee trout of New Hampshire and Vermont and the blueback trout of northern Maine.

== Distribution and habitat ==
The Sunapee trout is often a foot long and is said to actually be silver in color. It is a distinct strain of Arctic char, having become trapped by changed drainage systems and climates in numerous lakes and ponds in New England and southeastern Québec. The lake for which this subspecies is most noted for is Sunapee Lake in New Hampshire. In the wake of the retreating glacial front approximately 8,000 years ago, following the end of the last ice age, the Arctic char, an extremely coldwater, anadromous fish, was still spawning in New England. After the climate changed sufficiently, anadromous Arctic char stopped spawning in New England, leaving several lacustrine populations of Arctic char cut off from the bulk of the species in deep, cold, clear lakes in Vermont, New Hampshire, Maine, and Québec. The lake populations of Arctic char in Maine are termed "blueback trout," those in Québec are termed "Québec red trout," and the populations that used to exist in Vermont and New Hampshire along with the current population in Floods Pond, Maine, are termed Sunapee golden trout.

The Sunapee Lake strain of the Sunapee trout was discovered in 1977 when Kent Ball, of Idaho Fish and Game, discovered a char species living with brook trout in a mountain lake in Idaho. Analysis by Robert Benhke, Eric Wagner, and Steve Culver proved the species to be a presumably introduced population of Sunapee trout. Later research found reports of a trout egg trade between the Idaho and the New Hampshire Fish and Game departments. They are reportedly found in two Idaho bodies of water, Alice and Sawtooth Lakes.

== Decline in New England ==
By the late 19th century, as the New Hampshire and Vermont lakes developed its own steady summer tourism, recreational fishermen who sought to increase their catches began to introduce new fish species into these lakes, and these eventually overwhelmed the native Sunapee golden trout. Lake trout, a larger char that holds the same ecological niche as Sunapee trout, out-competed the Sunapee golden trout and hybridized with it, further accelerating its decline. The world record Sunapee golden trout was most likely a hybrid between the two species. Soon after that record-setting catch, the Sunapee golden trout could no longer be found in its resident lakes, becoming extirpated in New Hampshire and Vermont.

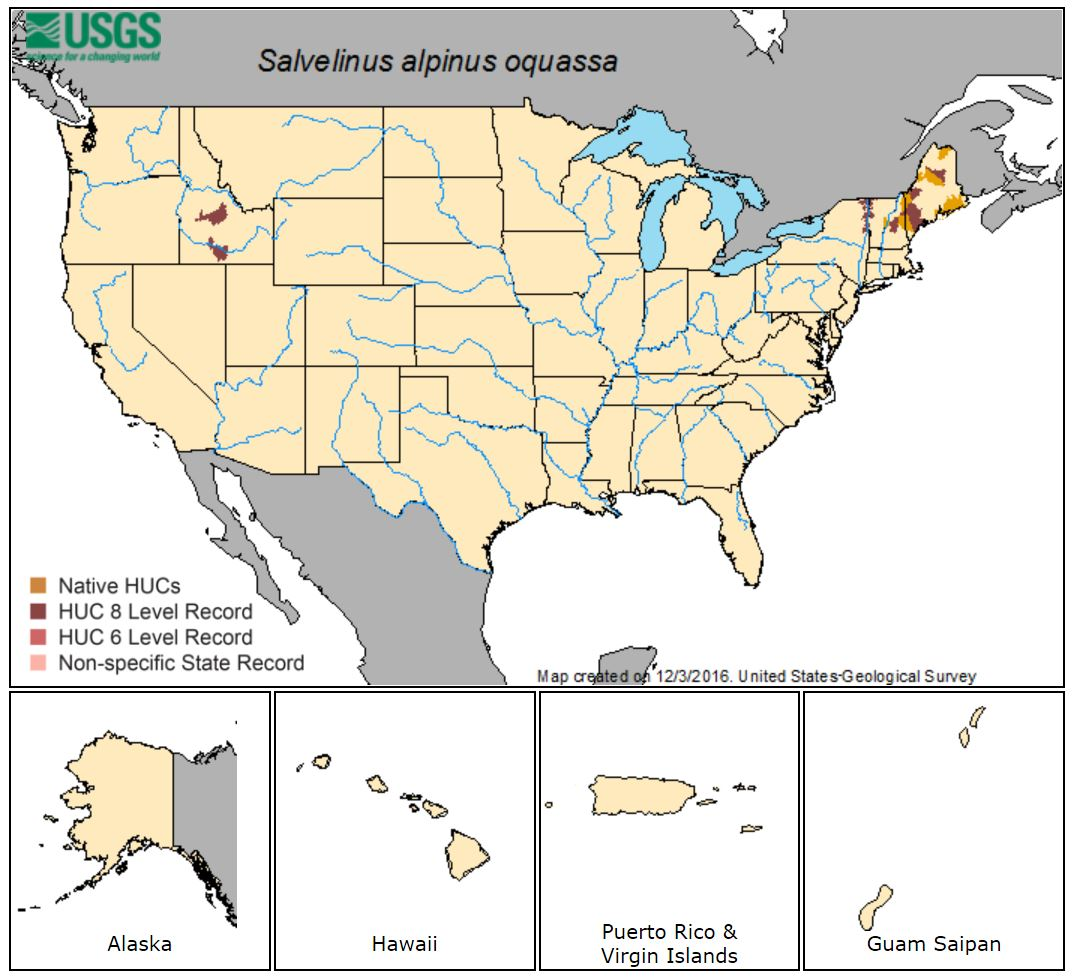
USGS Non-Indigenous Species Range Map-Salvelinus alpinus oquassa
