= Virvatnet =

Lake in Rana, Norway

Virvatnet (Norwegian); Viresjávrre (Lule Sami); Vijriesjaevrie (Southern Sami)
- Interactive map of the lake
- Location: Rana Municipality, Nordland
- Coordinates: 66.3101°N 15.4036°E
- Primary outflows: Virvasselva
- Basin countries: Norway
- Max. length: 3.2 kilometres (2.0 mi)
- Max. width: 1.5 kilometres (0.93 mi)
- Surface area: 2.67 km^{2} (1.03 sq mi)
- Shore length^{1}: 11.82 kilometres (7.34 mi)
- Surface elevation: 645 metres (2,116 ft)
- References: NVE
- ^{1} Shore length is not a well-defined measure.

Virvatnet (Norwegian), Vijriesjaevrie (Southern Sami), or Viresjávrre (Lule Sami) is a lake in Rana Municipality in Nordland county, Norway. It is located in the southeastern corner of the municipality, about 20 kilometres (12 mi) south of the mountain Bolna and less than 2 kilometres (1.2 mi) west of the border with Sweden.

== See also ==
- List of lakes in Norway
- Geography of Norway
