= Parks Peak =

Mountain in the state of Idaho

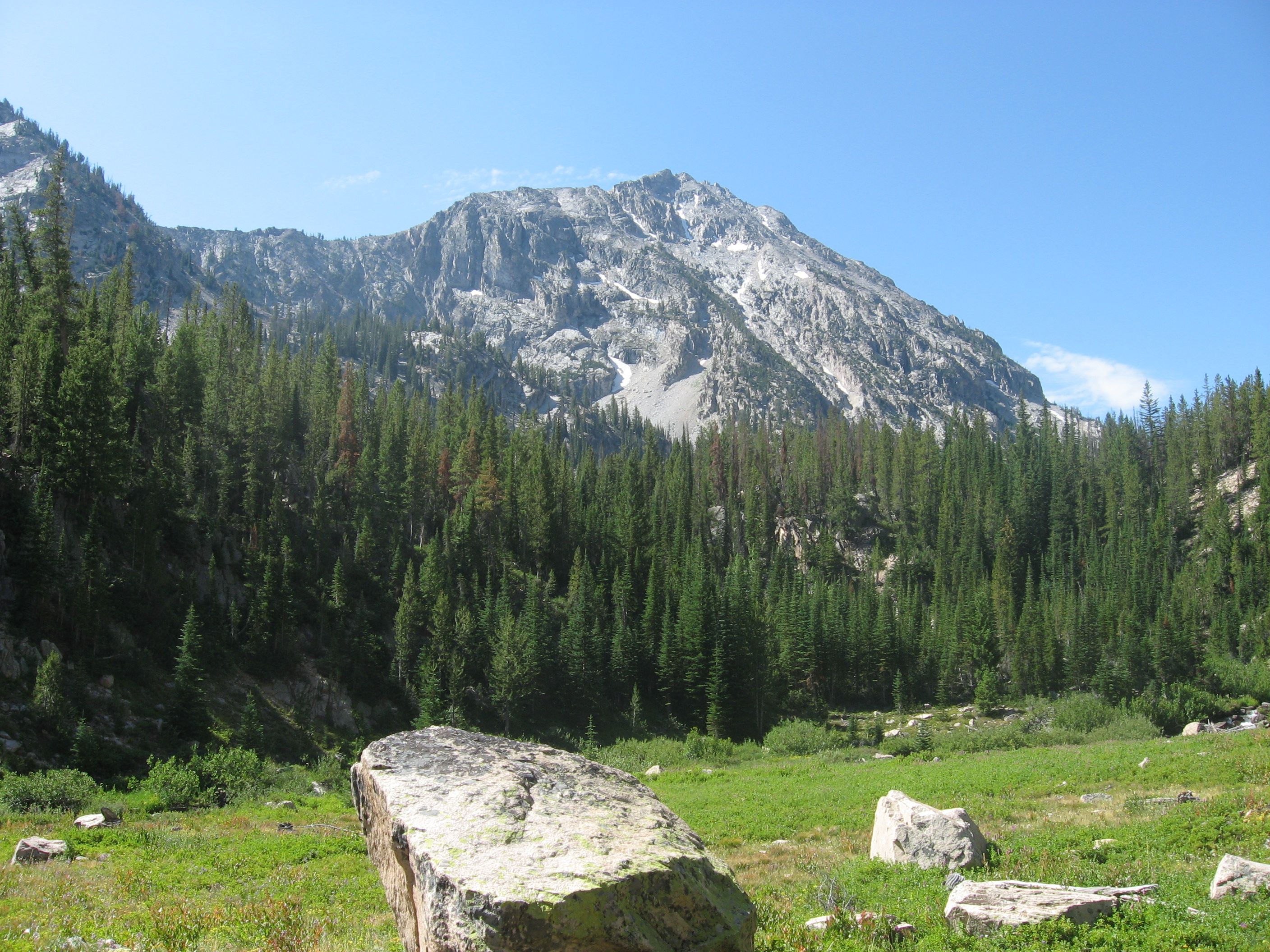
- Parks Peak

Highest point
- Elevation: 10,280 ft (3,130 m)
- Prominence: 920 ft (280 m)
- Parent peak: Snowyside Peak
- Coordinates: 43°58′02″N 114°55′58″W

Geography
- Location within Idaho
- Location: Blaine and Custer counties, Idaho, U.S.
- Parent range: Sawtooth Range
- Topo map: USGS Snowyside Peak

Climbing
- Easiest route: Scrambling, class 3

Parks Peak, at 10,280 feet (3,130 m) above sea level is a peak in the Sawtooth Range of Idaho. The peak is located in the Sawtooth Wilderness of Sawtooth National Recreation Area on the border of Blaine and Custer counties. The peak is located 2.78 mi (4.47 km) northeast of Snowyside Peak, its line parent, and 1.9 mi (3.1 km) northwest of McDonald Peak. Farley Lake is north of the peak and Bowknot and Toxaway lakes are west of the peak.
