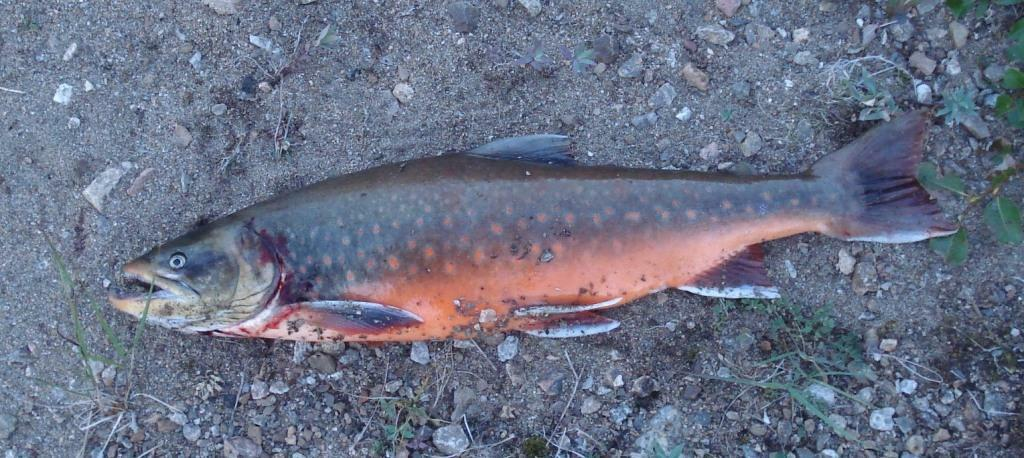
- In Labrador, Canada
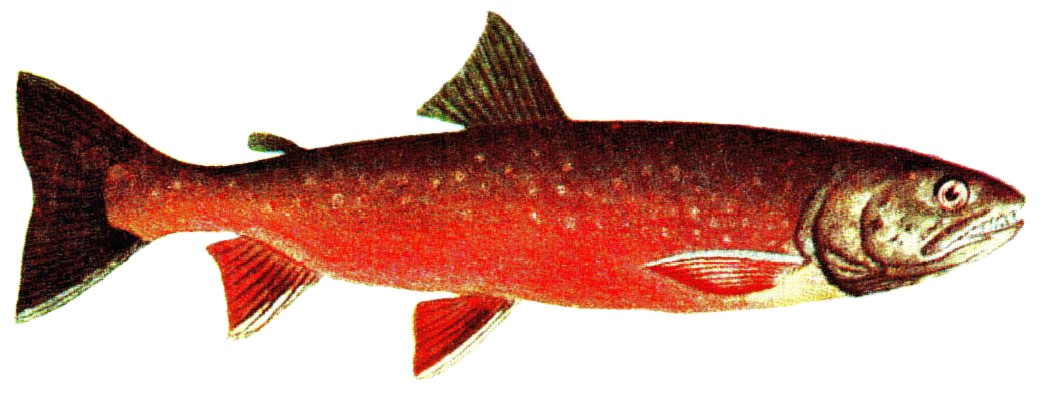
- 1911 illustration

Conservation status
- Least Concern (IUCN 3.1)

Scientific classification
- Kingdom: Animalia
- Phylum: Chordata
- Class: Actinopterygii
- Division: Teleostei
- Order: Salmoniformes
- Family: Salmonidae
- Genus: Salvelinus
- Species: S. alpinus

Binomial name
- Salvelinus alpinus (Linnaeus, 1758)

Synonyms
- List: Salmo alpinus Linnaeus, 1758 Salmo carbonarius Strøm, 1784 Salmo levis Mohr, 1786 Salmo palja Walbaum, 1792 Salmo trutta laevis Walbaum, 1792 Salmo laevis Walbaum, 1792 Salmo punctatus Cuvier, 1829 Salmo nivalis Faber, 1829 Salmo ventricosus Nilsson, 1832 Salmo rutilus Nilsson, 1832 Salmo ascanii Valenciennes, 1848 Salmo oquassa Girard, 1854 Salmo salvelinostagnalis Smitt, 1886 Salmo alpinostagnalis Smitt, 1886 Salmo hybridus Smitt, 1886 Salvelinus aureolus Bean, 1887 Salvelinus lepechini melanostomus Berg, 1932 Salvelinus lepechini profundicola Berg, 1932

= Arctic char =

Species of ray-finned fish

The Arctic char or Arctic charr (Salvelinus alpinus) is a cold-water fish in the family Salmonidae, native to alpine lakes, as well as Arctic and subarctic coastal waters in the Holarctic. It is the world's most northerly freshwater fish. Some populations are anadromous.

== Taxonomy ==
The Arctic char was initially scientifically described in the salmon genus Salmo as Salmo alpinus by Carl Linnaeus in the 1758 edition of Systema Naturae, which is the work that established the system of binomial nomenclature for animals. Meanwhile, he described Salmo salvelinus and Salmo umbla, which were later considered as synonyms of S. alpinus. John Richardson (1836) separated them into a subgenus Salmo (Salvelinus), which now is treated as a full genus. The genus name Salvelinus is from German Saibling – little salmon.

The English name is thought to derive from Old Irish ceara/cera meaning "[blood] red", referring to its pink-red underside. This would also connect with its Welsh name torgoch, "red belly".

=== Putative subspecies ===
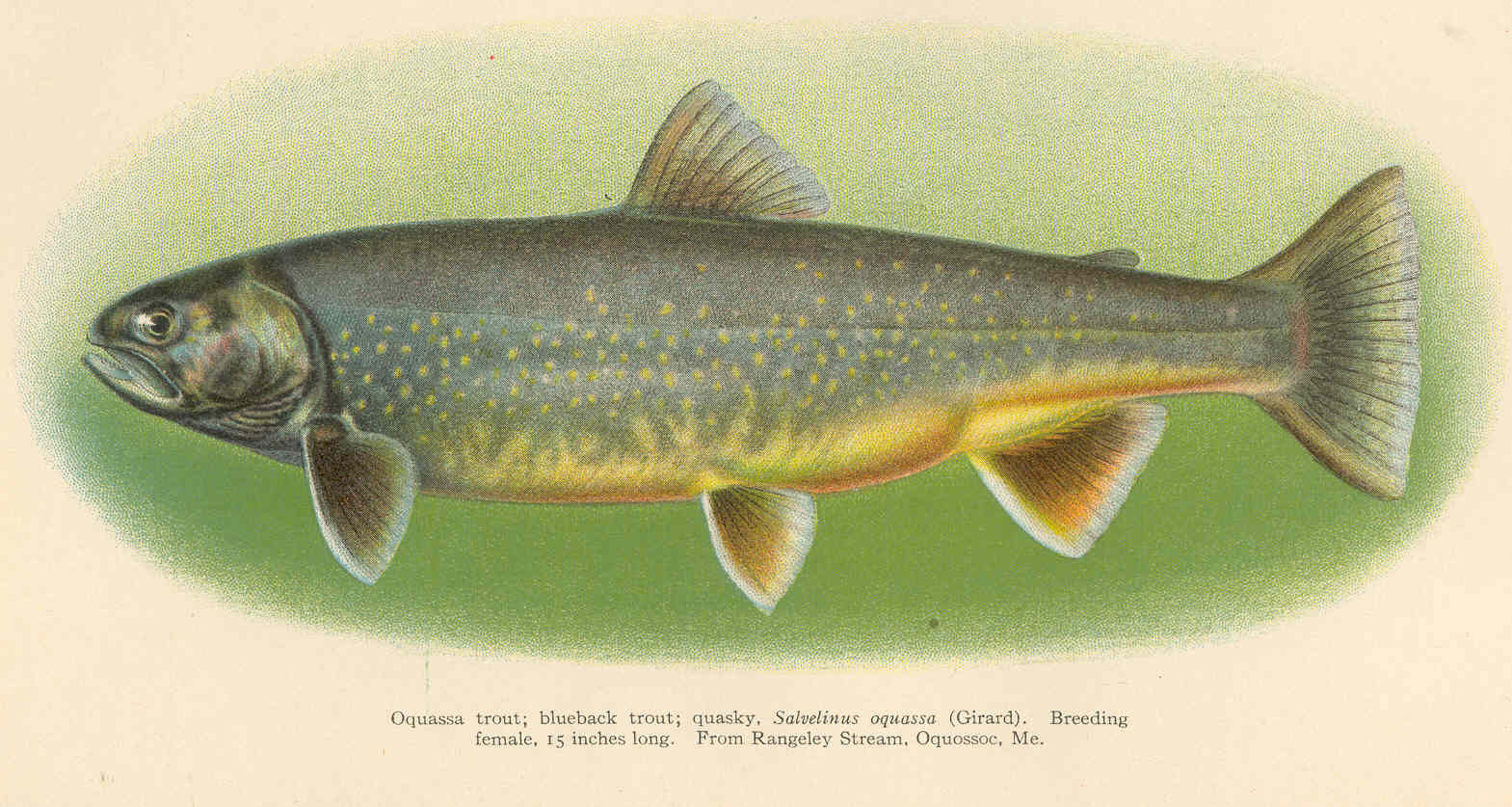
"Sunapee trout"

In North America, three subspecies of Salvelinus alpinus have been recognized.

- "S. a. erythrinus" is native to almost all of Canada's northern coast. This subspecies is nearly always anadromous.
- S. a. oquassa, known as the blueback trout or Sunapee trout, is native to eastern Quebec and northern New England, although it has been extirpated from most of its northeastern United States range. S. a. oquassa is never anadromous.
- S. a. taranetzi is known as the dwarf Arctic char.

These scientific names are not generally accepted, however, as the names S. a. erythrinus and S. a. taranetzi usually refer to subspecies that are endemic to Siberia only.

=== Morphs ===
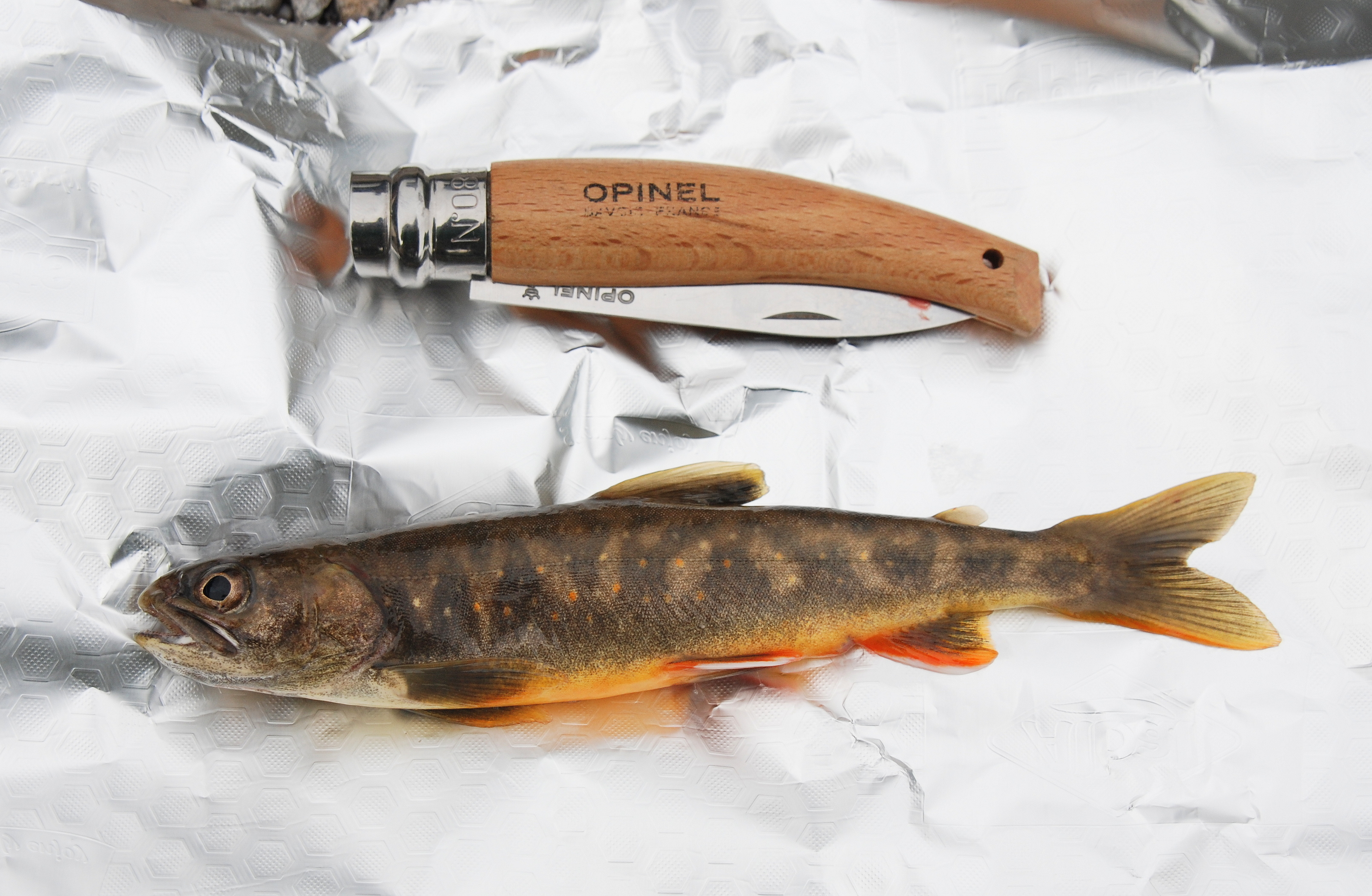
"Dwarf" Arctic char in Germany

Arctic char is notable for exhibiting numerous, seemingly distinct morphological variants or 'morphs' throughout the range of the species. Consequently, Arctic char have been referred to as the "most variable vertebrate on Earth". These morphs are often sympatric within lakes or rivers. Morphs often vary significantly in size, shape, and colour. Morphs often demonstrate differences in migratory behaviour, being resident or anadromous fish, and in feeding behaviour and niche placement. Morphs often interbreed, but they can also be reproductively isolated and represent genetically distinct populations, which have been cited as examples of incipient speciation.

In Iceland, Þingvallavatn is noted for the evolution of four morphs: small benthic, large benthic, small limnetic and large limnetic.

In Svalbard, Norway, Lake Linnévatn on Spitsbergen has dwarf, 'normal', and normal-sized anadromous fish, and Lake Ellasjøen on Bear Island has a dwarf, small littoral and large pelagic morph. In 2004, a previously unknown species closely related to Arctic char was discovered swimming near the bottom of Lake Tinn, Norway, at a depth of 430 m (1,410 ft); the light-colored, translucent fish is up to 15 cm (5.9 in) long and lacks a swim bladder.

In Sweden three morphs are usually recognised: storröding, större fjällröding and mindre fjällröding. Wherever these types occur together in the same lake storröding is the largest. Contrary to what the name may suggest when större fjällröding and mindre fjällröding are found together mindre fjällröding tend to be the largest morph. Even within storröding morphs can be found; for example the Sommen charr of Lake Sommen tend to grow faster and reach sexual maturity later than the char from Lake Vättern.

=== Hybrids ===
Arctic char is known to produce hybrids with its congeners, Salvelinus namaycush (lake trout) and Salvelinus fontinalis (brook trout).

The sparctic char is the intrageneric hybrid between Arctic char and brook trout. Sparctic char grows faster than either parent species, are stronger and healthier, and are thus popular for sports fisheries. Some of these hybrids are fertile while others are sterile. Sparctic char have been found locally in Sweden, for example in the Piteälven and Skellefteälven rivers in the northern part of the country, though are believed to be relatively uncommon.

There has been no formal naming of the hybrid between Arctic char and lake trout as few studies have been done in regard to this hybridization.

== Distribution and habitat ==
It spawns in freshwater and its populations can be lacustrine, riverine, or anadromous, where they return from the ocean to their fresh water birth rivers to spawn. No other freshwater fish is found as far north; it is, for instance, the only fish species in Lake Hazen, which extends up to 81°56′N 68°55′W on Ellesmere Island in the Canadian Arctic. It is one of the rarest fish species in Great Britain and Ireland, found mainly in deep, cold, glacial lakes, and is at risk there from acidification. In other parts of its range, such as the Nordic countries, it is much more common, and is fished extensively. In Siberia, it is known as golets (Russian: голец) and it has been introduced in lakes where it sometimes threatens less hardy endemic species, such as the small-mouth char and the long-finned char in Elgygytgyn Lake.

Arctic char is also found in Lake Pingualuit in the Ungava Peninsula, Quebec, a lake situated in an impact crater formed roughly 1.4 million years ago. Since the last glaciation, changing water levels are believed to have connected the lake with glacial runoff and surrounding streams and rivers, allowing char to swim upstream into the lake. Arctic char is the only fish found in the lake, and signs of fish cannibalism have been found. Arctic char exhibits a mostly circumpolar distribution. There is no other species of freshwater fish found at a higher latitude. Arctic char is native to Arctic and subarctic coasts and lakes of high elevations. In general, it has been observed in the Canadian Arctic, Greenland, Iceland, Scandinavia, Siberia, and Alaska.

Anadromous Arctic chars migrate to the sea annually in mid-June to mid-July. After about two months, they return to fresh water to reproduce and overwinter.

== Description ==
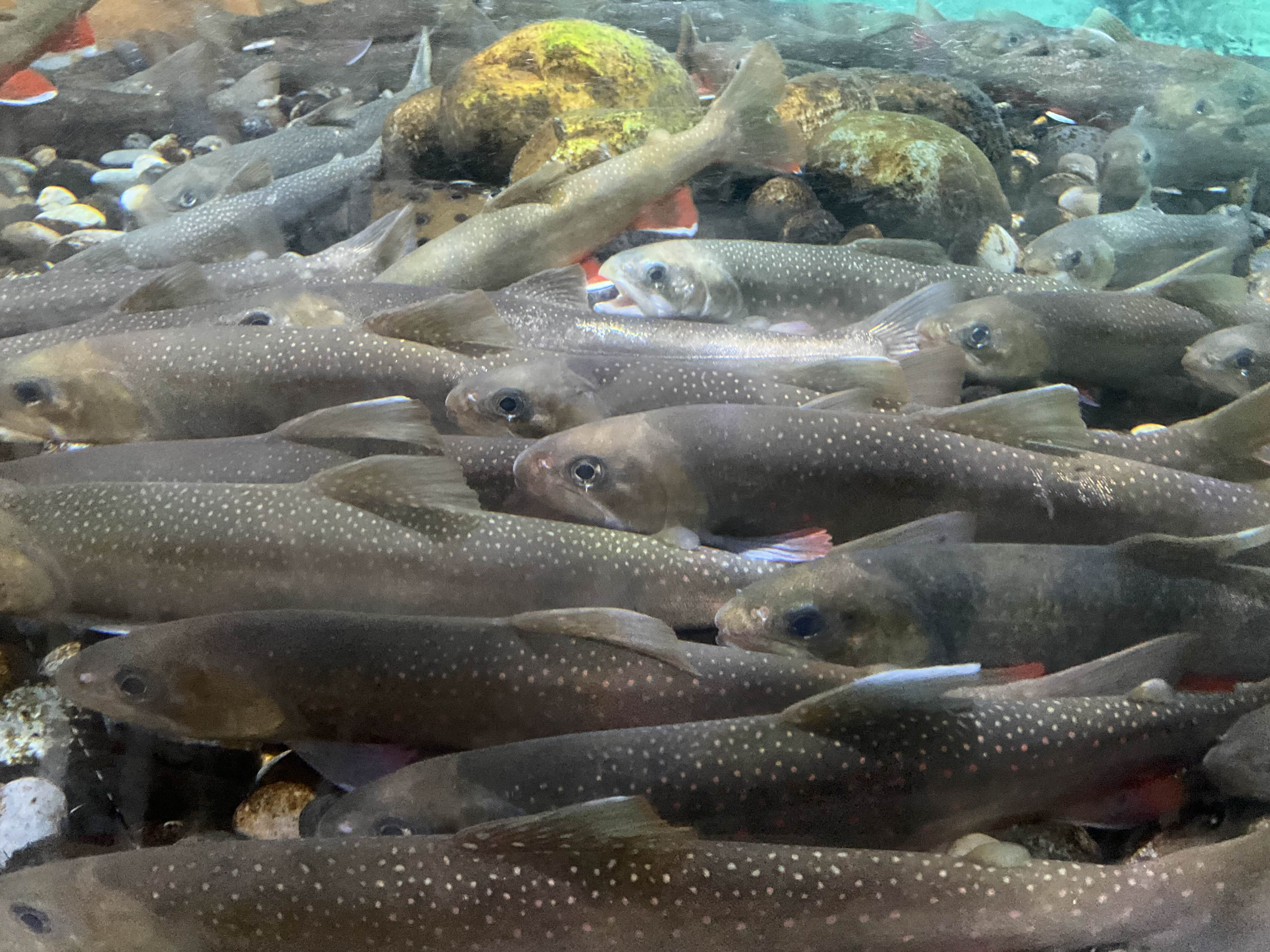
At the Vancouver Aquarium

The Arctic char is closely related to both salmon and trout, such as the Atlantic salmon and lake trout, and has many characteristics of both. The fish is highly variable in colour, depending on the time of year and the environmental conditions of the lake where it lives. The appearance of Arctic char differs between populations. The dorsal side of the Arctic char is dark in its colour while the ventral varies from red, yellow, and white.

Arctic char has a distinct size dimorphism, dwarf and giant. Dwarf Arctic char weigh between 0.2 and 2.3 kg (7 oz and 5 lb 1 oz) and average a length of 8 cm (3 in), while giant Arctic char weigh between 2.3 and 4.5 kg (5 lb 1 oz and 9 lb 15 oz) and average 40 cm (16 in) in length. Individual fish can weigh 9 kg (20 lb) or more with record-sized fish having been taken by anglers in Northern Canada, where it is known as iqaluk or tariungmiutaq in Inuktitut. Generally, whole market-sized fish are between 1 and 2.5 kg (2 lb 3 oz and 5 lb 8 oz). Male and female Arctic char are the same size.

The flesh colour can range from a bright red to a pale pink.

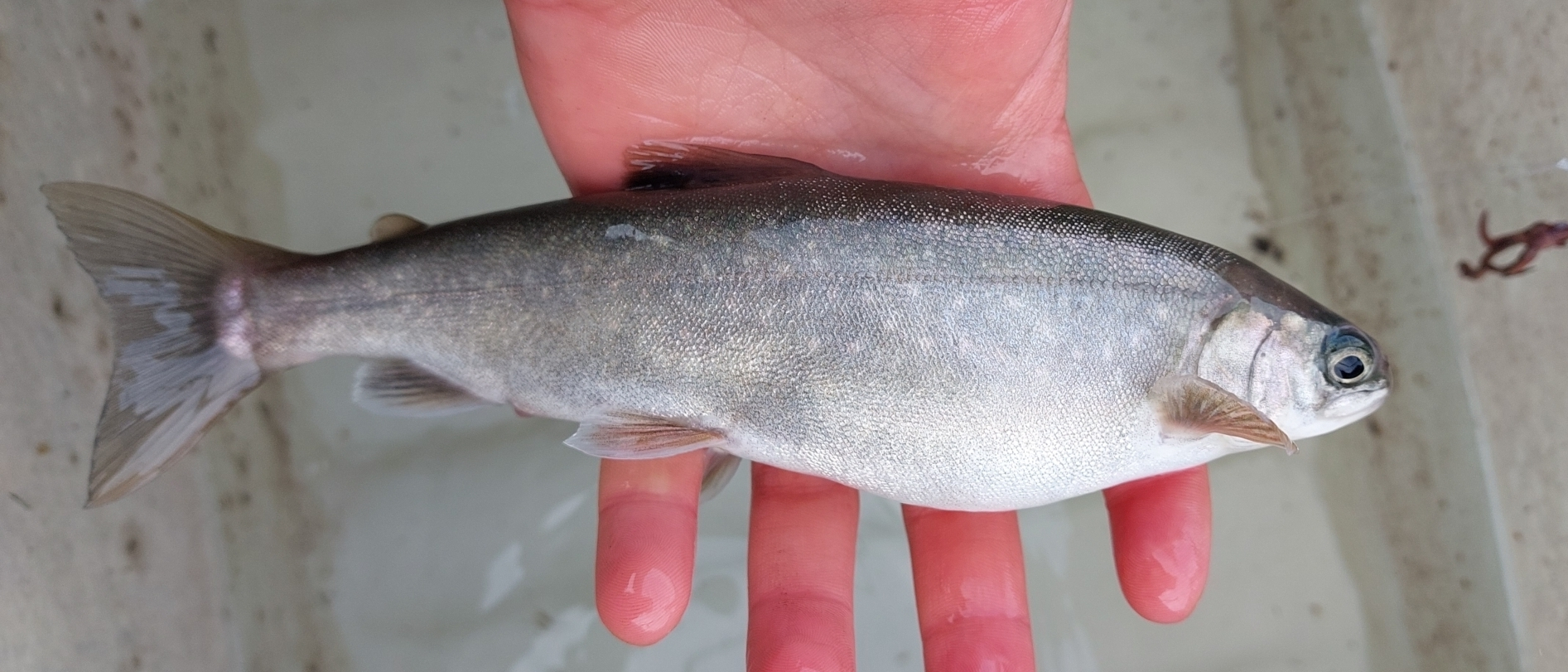
In Switzerland

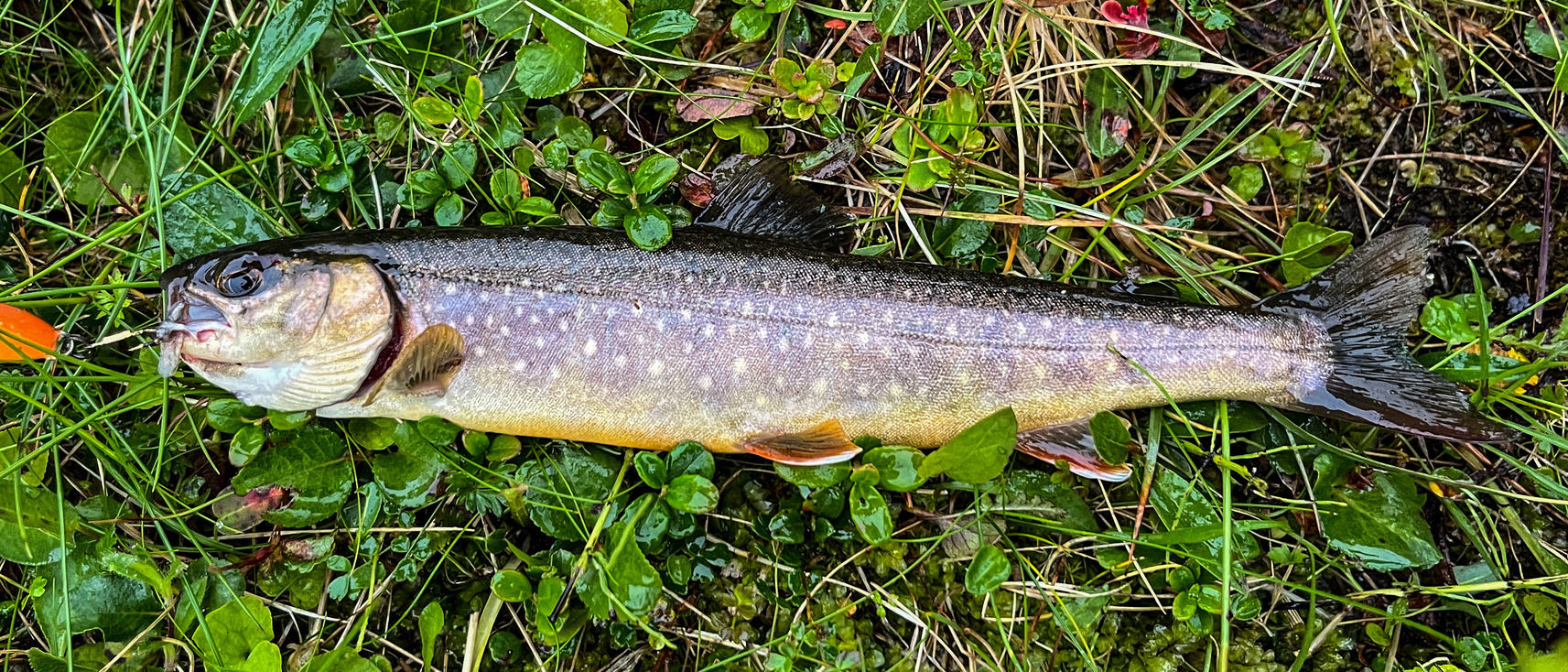
In Norway

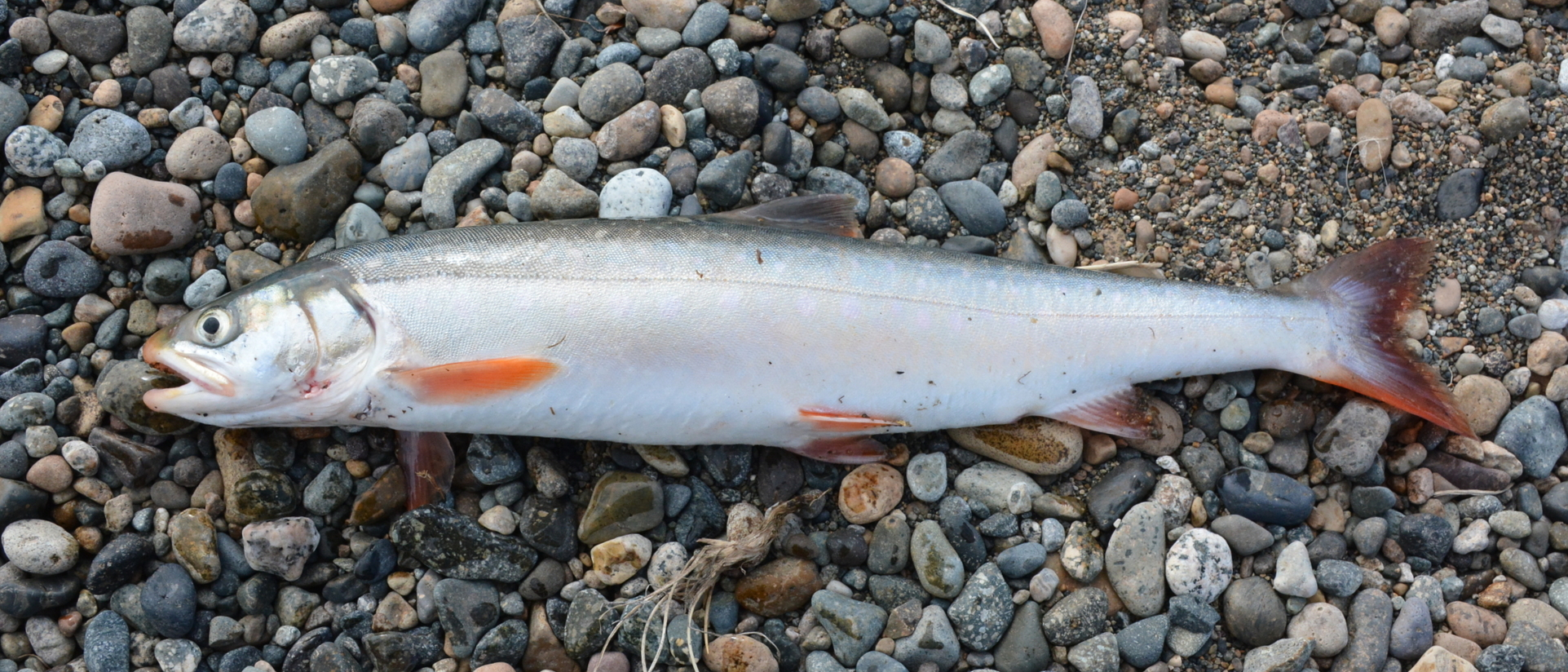
In Providensky, Russia

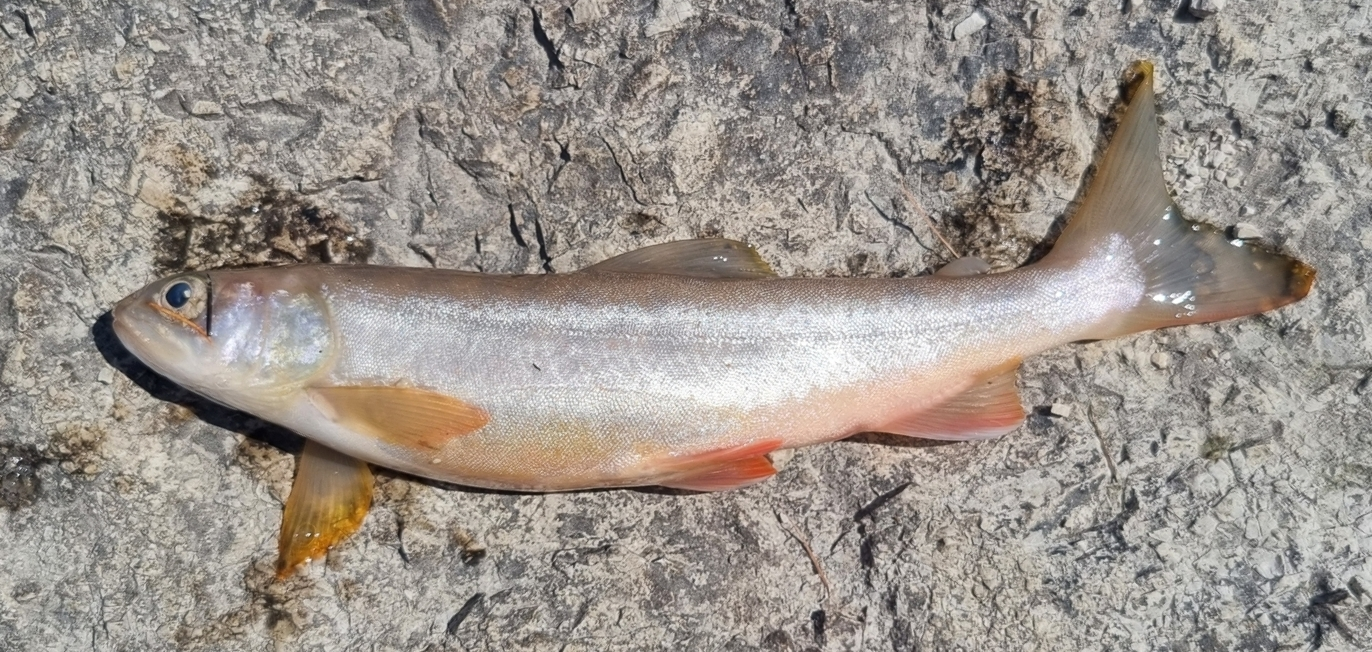
In Austria

== Ecology ==
=== Migration ===
Arctic char can be anadromous, landlocked, or semi-anadromous.

Arctic chars found north of 65°N latitude are generally anadromous. Anadromous Arctic chars spend their juvenile years in fresh water, and once mature, migrate annually to the marine environment. The first migration of Arctic char has been found to occur between 4 and 13 years of age. When in the marine environment, Arctic chars inhabit coastal and intertidal areas. They migrate back to frozen lakes at the end of summer.

Generally, Arctic char inhabits shallow waters, rarely swimming deeper than 3 m (10 ft) depth. An exception to the general pattern applies to landlocked Arctic chars, which often swim much deeper in the summer to occupy colder waters. Dwarf Arctic chars are more common in landlocked populations as a result of scarce resources (immense competition).

=== Predation ===
The main predators of Arctic char include sea otters (Enhyrda lutris), polar bears (Ursus maritimus), humans (Homo sapiens), ferox trout (Salmo ferox), and other fish species. Dwarf Arctic char are also often cannibalistically consumed by giant Arctic char. As ferox trout are an apex predator, Arctic char is thus a key species throughout many lakes in its range.

Arctic char often demonstrates crypsis when defending from their predators. It will appear darker in its freshwater environments and lighter in its marine environments. Additionally, some juveniles have highly sensitive recognition of predator odours and respond to chemical cues from different fish predators.

=== Diet ===
The diet of Arctic char varies with season and location. Arctic chars are generally opportunists. There have been more than 30 species found in the stomachs of Arctic chars.

During late spring and summer, Arctic char feeds on insects found on the water's surface, salmon eggs, snails and other smaller crustaceans found on the lake bottom, and smaller fish up to a third of its size. During the autumn and winter months, it feeds on zooplankton and freshwater shrimps that are suspended in the lake, and also occasionally on smaller fish.

The marine diet of Arctic char consists mostly of a copepod species (Calanis finmarchicus) and krill (Thysanoëssa). Lake-dwelling Arctic chars feed mostly on insects and zoobenthos. Some giant Arctic chars have been recorded as cannibals of their young as well as dwarf Arctic chars.

== Reproduction ==
=== Spawning ===
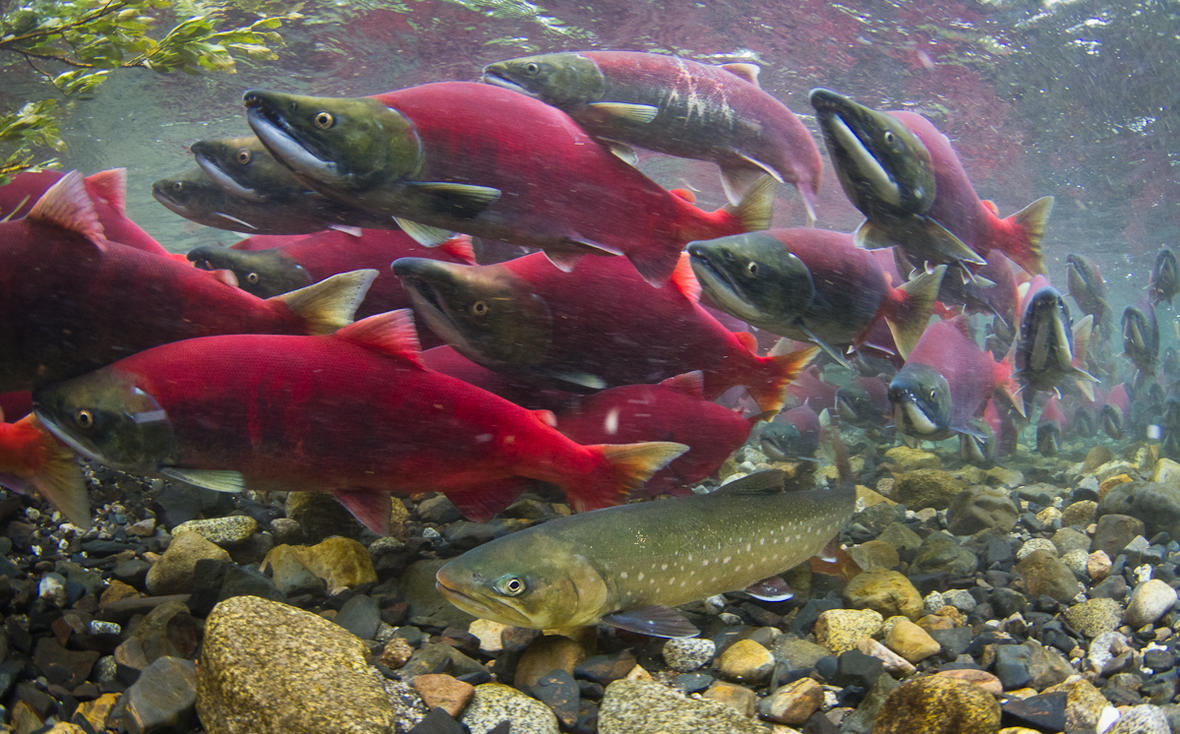
An Arctic char amidst a school of migrating sockeye salmon

Spawning occurs over rocky shoals in lakes with heavy wave action and in slower gravel-bottom pools in rivers. As with most salmonids, vast differences in colouration and body shape occur between sexually mature males and females. Males develop hooked jaws known as kypes and take on a brilliant red colour. Females remain fairly silver. Males are polygamous in sexual nature each season. They will circumambulate the females by rubbing up against them slightly. As the female lays her eggs, the male fertilizes her, which takes place during the daylight hours. Most males set up and guard territories and often spawn with several females. The female constructs the nest, or redd.

A female anadromous char usually deposits from 3000 to 5000 eggs. Arctic char do not die after spawning like Pacific salmon, and often spawn several times throughout their lives, typically every second or third year. Young Arctic char emerge from the gravel in spring and stay in the river from 5 to 7 months, or until they are about 15–20 cm (6–8 in) in length. Sexual maturity in Arctic char ranges from 4 to 10 years old and 50–60 cm (20–24 in) in length.

=== Hatchlings ===
Time to hatching varies, but usually occurs between two and three months, with the longest have been observed at five months. Arctic char range between 40 and 70 mg upon hatching. Hatchlings are immediately independent of parents at hatching, and stay at the bottom of the gravel till they are 15–18 cm (6–7 in) in length. Growth rates of Arctic char vary greatly.

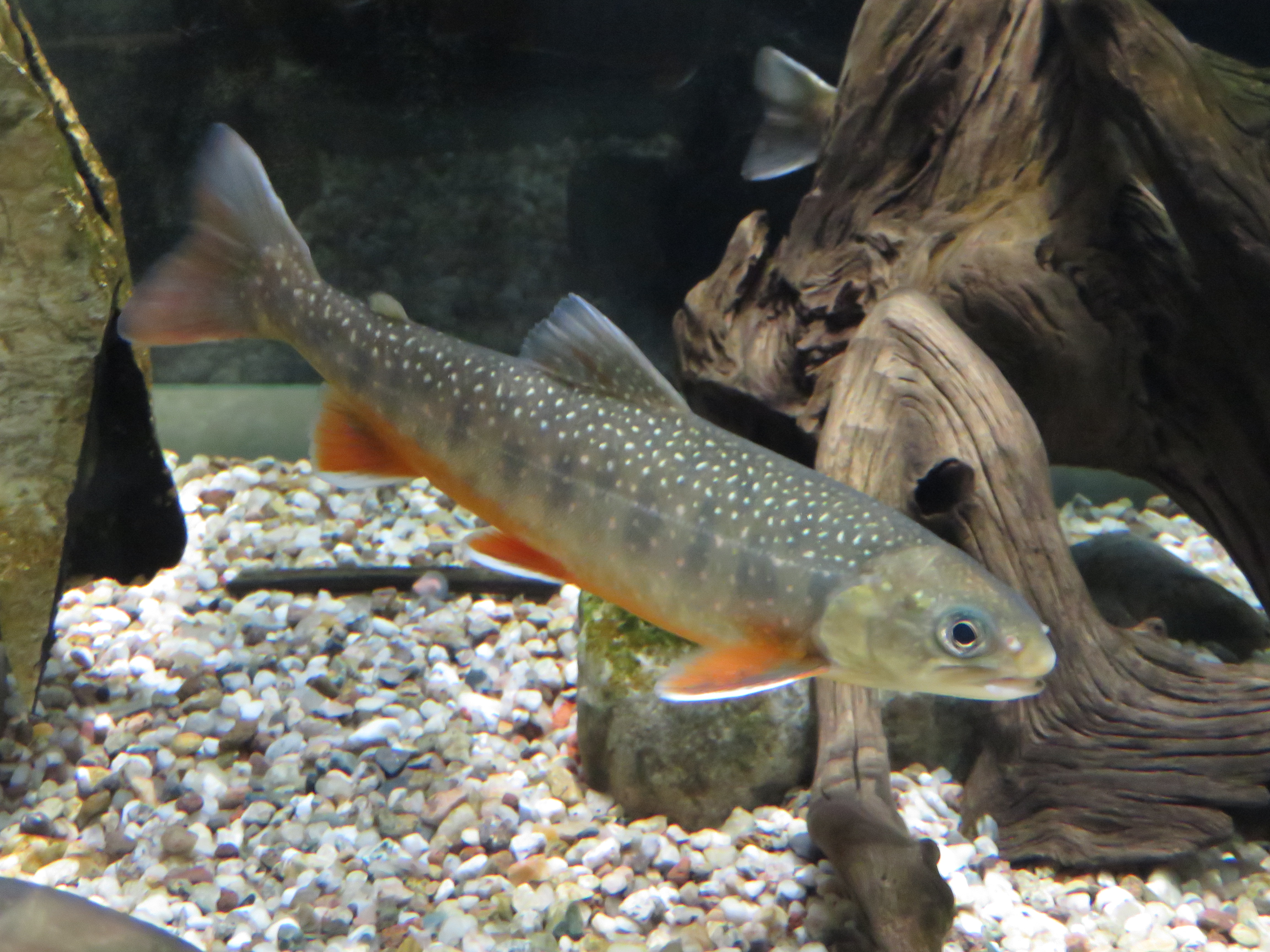
A juvenile Arctic char

Natural Resources Wales releases more than 5500 rare Arctic char in a lake in Wales, in a bid to preserve the species.

Underwater video of char at Llyn Padarn, Wales

== Human culture ==
=== Fisheries ===
Capture (blue) and aquaculture (green) production of Arctic char (Salvelinus alpinus) in thousand tonnes from 1960 to 2022, as reported by the FAO

Numerous commercial fisheries are located in river systems throughout the Canadian Arctic, with the majority in Nunavut, such as the areas of Cumberland Sound and Cambridge Bay. There are also exploratory fisheries to examine potential for future commercial char fishing areas.

Arctic char fisheries are important for the Inuit and in the subsistence economy of many circumpolar people. The fisheries are concentrated near communities and are predominately conducted using gill nets. In 2004, it was estimated that the subsistence harvest in the Cambridge Bay area was about 50% the size of the commercial harvest.

=== Farming ===
Video of young Arctic char being released into Llyn Padarn, Wales, in 2020

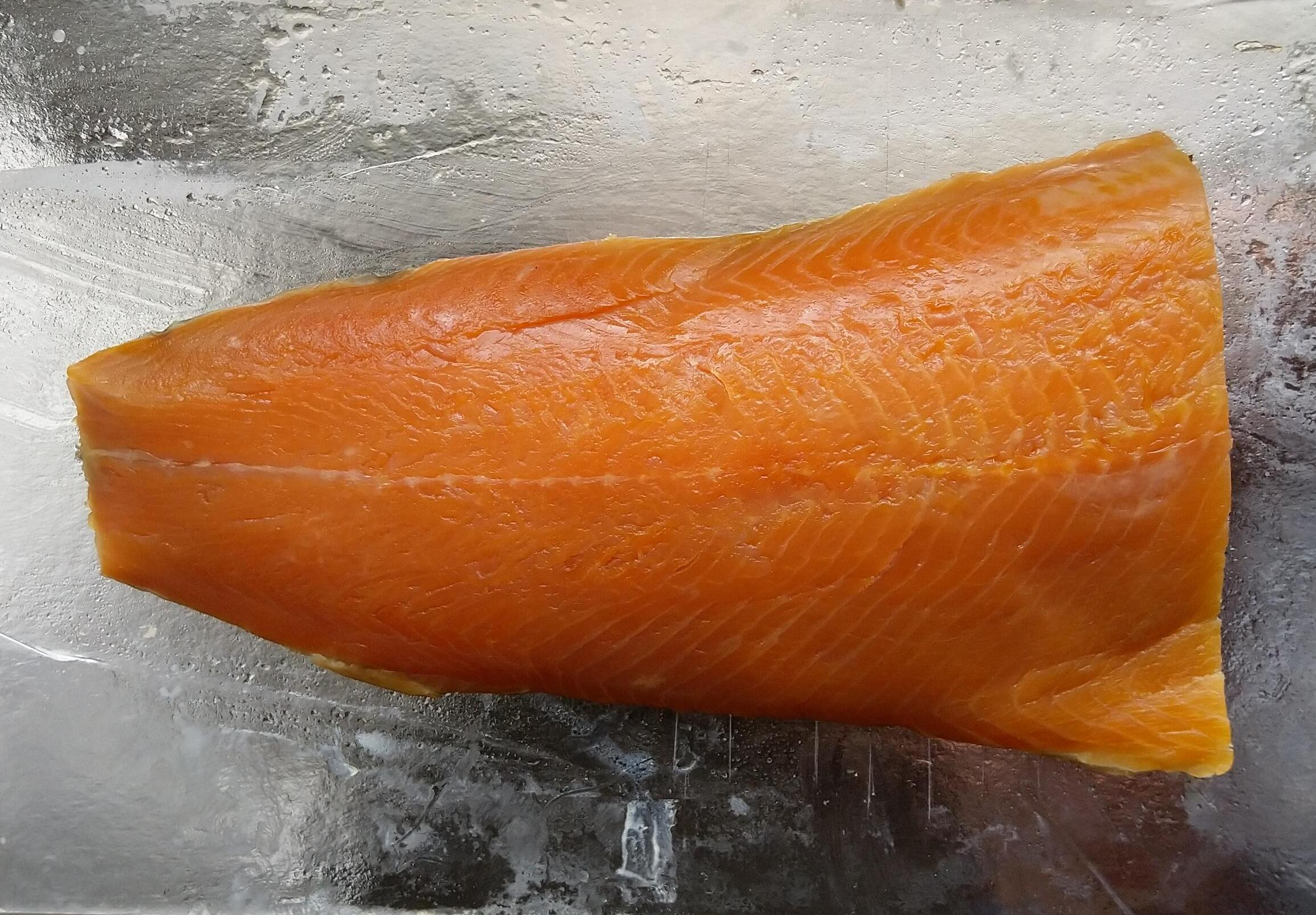
Smoked fillet, showing the orange flesh

Research aimed at determining the suitability of Arctic char as a cultured species has been going on since the late 1970s. The Canadian government's Freshwater Institute of Fisheries and Oceans Canada at Winnipeg, Manitoba, and the Huntsman Marine Science Centre of New Brunswick, pioneered the early efforts in Canada. Arctic char is also farmed in Iceland, Estonia, Norway, Sweden, Finland, West Virginia, and Ireland.

Arctic char was first investigated because they expected it to have low optimum temperature requirements and would grow well at the cold water temperatures present in numerous areas of Canada. It could be an alternate species to rainbow trout (Oncorhynchus mykiss), and could provide producers with a different niche in the marketplace. The initial research efforts concentrated on identifying the cultural needs and performance characteristics of the species. The Freshwater Institute was responsible for distributing small numbers of eggs to producers in Canada; these producers in return helped determine the suitability of Arctic char in a commercial setting. Commercial Arctic char breeding stocks have now been developed largely from these sources.

Arctic char eggs are hatched within specialized hatchery facilities. The young fish remain in the hatchery until they reach about 100 g (3 1/2 oz), and are then transferred to tanks each capable of holding 5000 fish. Arctic char first exhibits a rapid growth spurt during this phase, reaching its market weight of 1–2.5 kg (2–6 lb) within a year. They are fed dried pellets consisting mainly of fish meal and fish oil from forage fish that are too small and bony for human consumption. Carotenoids are also added, giving Arctic char its characteristic coral colouration.

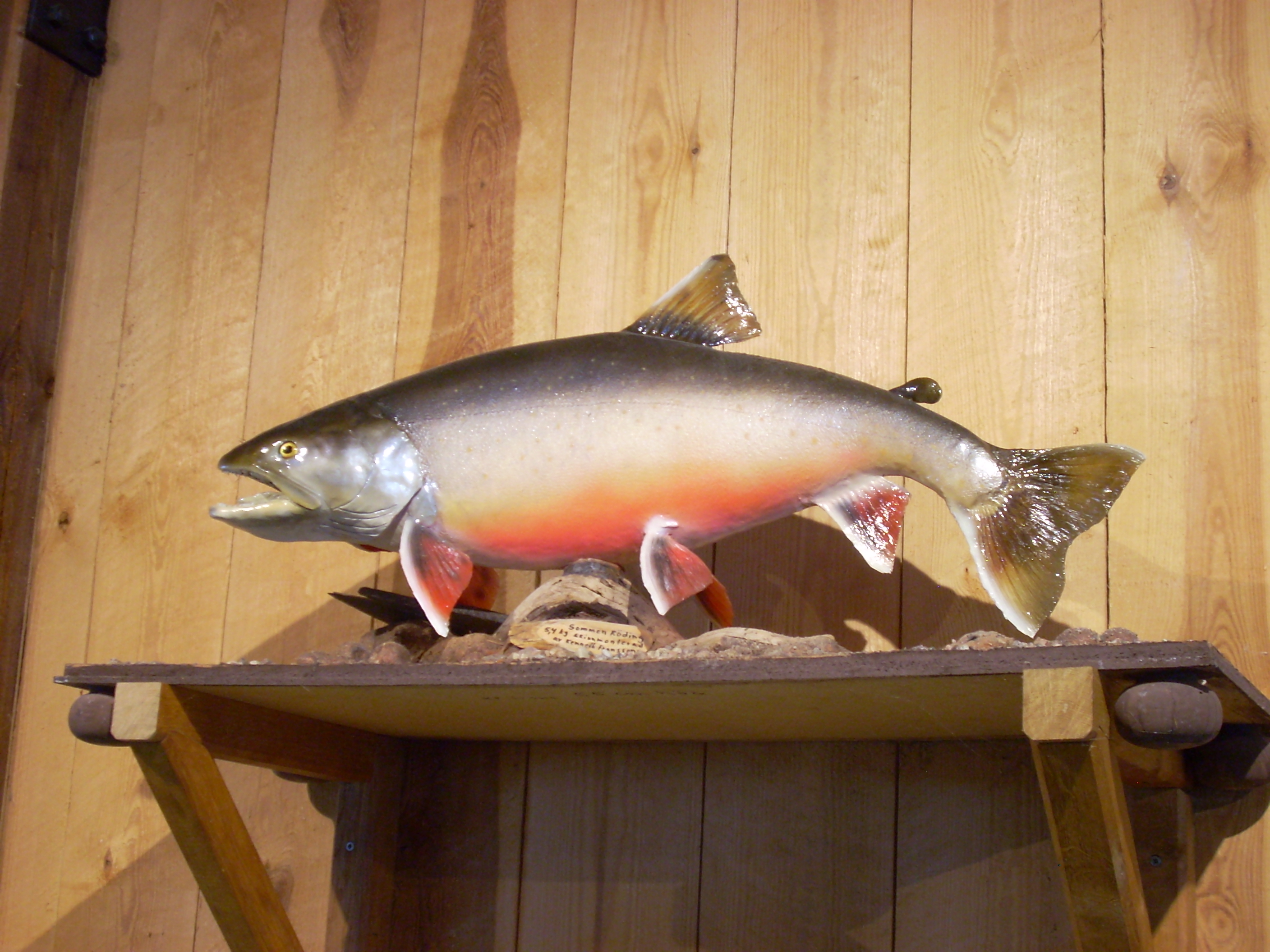
Model of a 5.4 kg (12 lb) Sommen charr in naturum Sommen

The land-based Arctic char farming systems are among the most environmentally responsible fish farming designs. They remove particulate matter and effluent prior to releasing water from the fish tanks into the environment. Sludge removed from the water is used to fertilize terrestrial crops. Leftovers from fish processing may be incorporated into dog food or delivered to local compost facilities.

In 2006, Monterey Bay Aquarium Seafood Watch program added farmed Arctic char as an environmentally sustainable Best Choice for consumers, stating: "Arctic char use only a moderate amount of marine resources for feed" and that they "are farmed in land-based, closed systems that minimize the risk of escape into the wild."

=== As food ===
Commercial Arctic char typically weigh 1–2.5 kg (2–6 lb). The flesh is fine-flaked and medium firm. The colour is between light pink and deep red, and the taste is like something between trout and salmon.
