= Alice Lake (Sawtooth Wilderness) =

Alpine lake in the state of Idaho

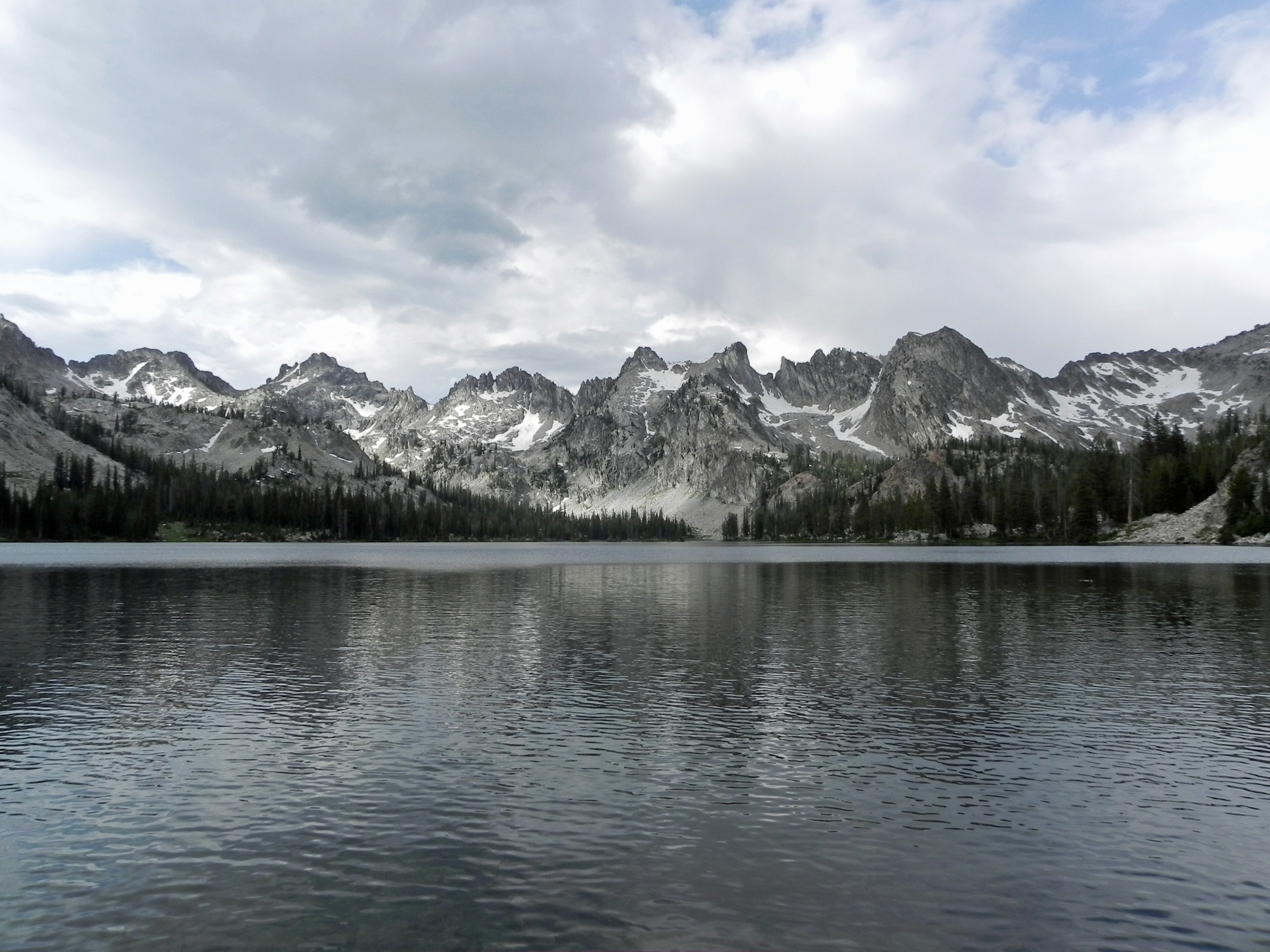
- Alice Lake in August 2011

- Location in the United States Location in Idaho
- Location: Blaine County, Idaho, U.S.
- Coordinates: 43°56′21″N 114°56′37″W
- Type: Glacial
- Primary outflows: Creek to Pettit Lake
- Basin countries: United States
- Max. length: 0.72 mi (1.16 km)
- Max. width: 0.23 mi (0.37 km)
- Surface area: 71.2 acres (28.8 ha)
- Surface elevation: 8,602 ft (2,622 m)

Alice Lake is an alpine lake in the western United States in central Idaho, located high in the Sawtooth Mountains in the Sawtooth National Recreation Area. In Blaine County, the lake is one of the largest in the Sawtooth Wilderness and is most easily accessed via the trailhead at Pettit Lake, accessed from State Highway 75 via Sawtooth National Forest road 208.

The direct route to the lake begins at the trailhead at the end of the Pettit Lake campground. The trail distance is about 5.5 mi (9 km) to the lake and gains about 1,600 feet (490 m) in elevation. The trail requires five stream crossings, only the last of which has a bridge.

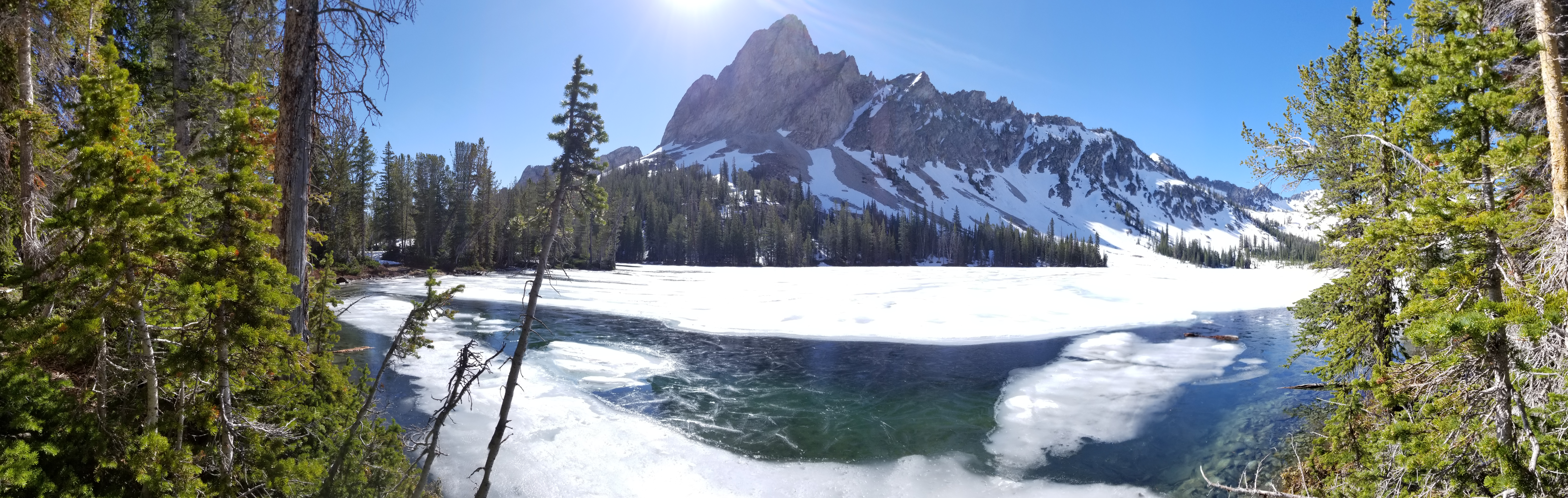
Picture taken in June, this is an unusual amount of snow for this time of year.

With a surface elevation of 8,602 feet (2,622 m) above sea level, Alice Lake can remain frozen into early summer. The lake is framed by the rocky peaks of the Sawtooth Mountains, to the east is El Capitan at 9,901 feet (3,018 m).

Alice Lake is within the Sawtooth Wilderness; wilderness permits are obtained at a registration box along the trail at the wilderness boundary, at the upstream end of Pettit Lake.

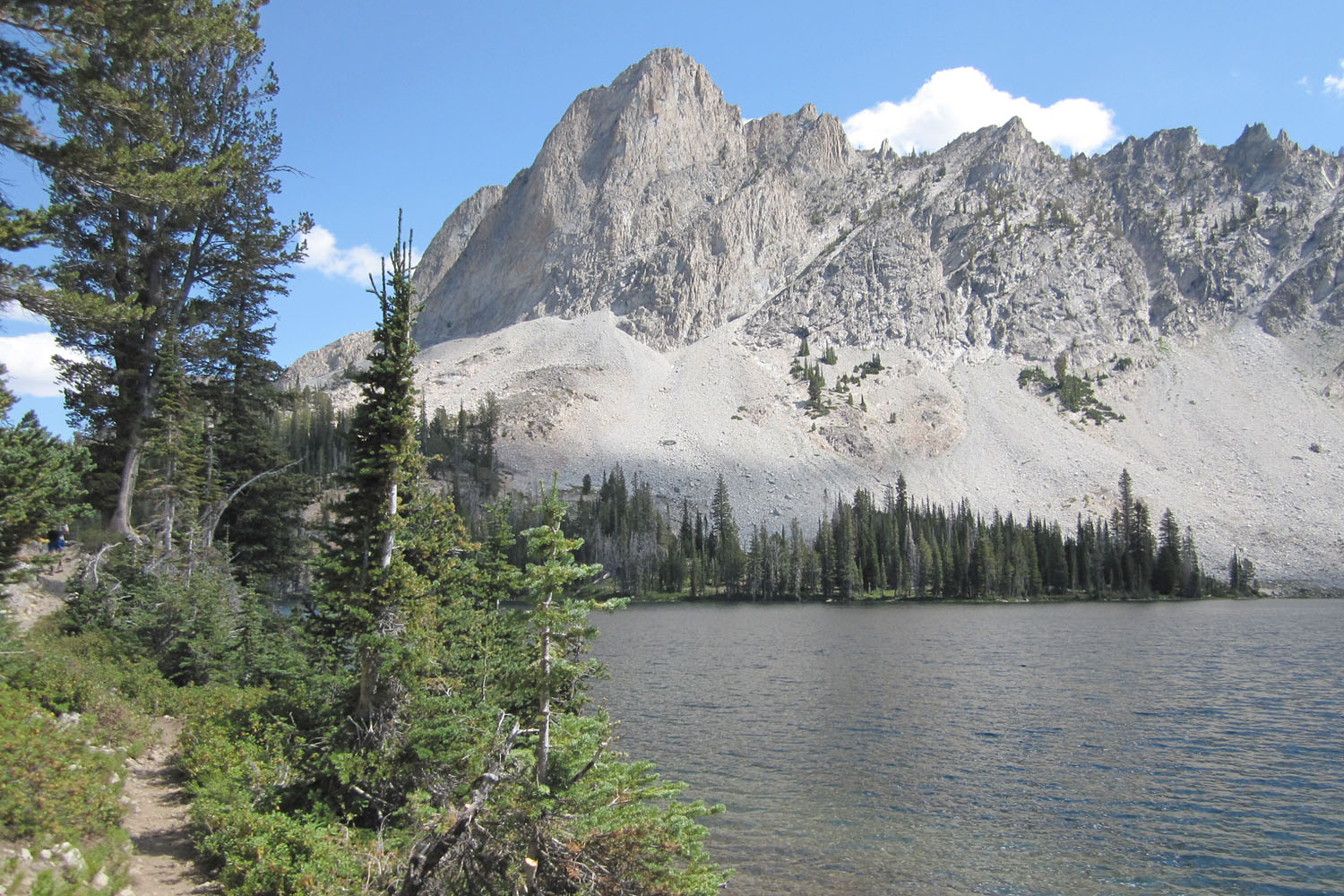
El Capitan, 9,901 feet (3,018 m), at Alice Lake, 8,602 ft (2,622 m).

== See also ==
- List of lakes of the Sawtooth Mountains (Idaho)
- Sawtooth National Forest
- Sawtooth National Recreation Area
- Sawtooth Range (Idaho)
