= Pettit Lake =

Large alpine lake in the state of Idaho

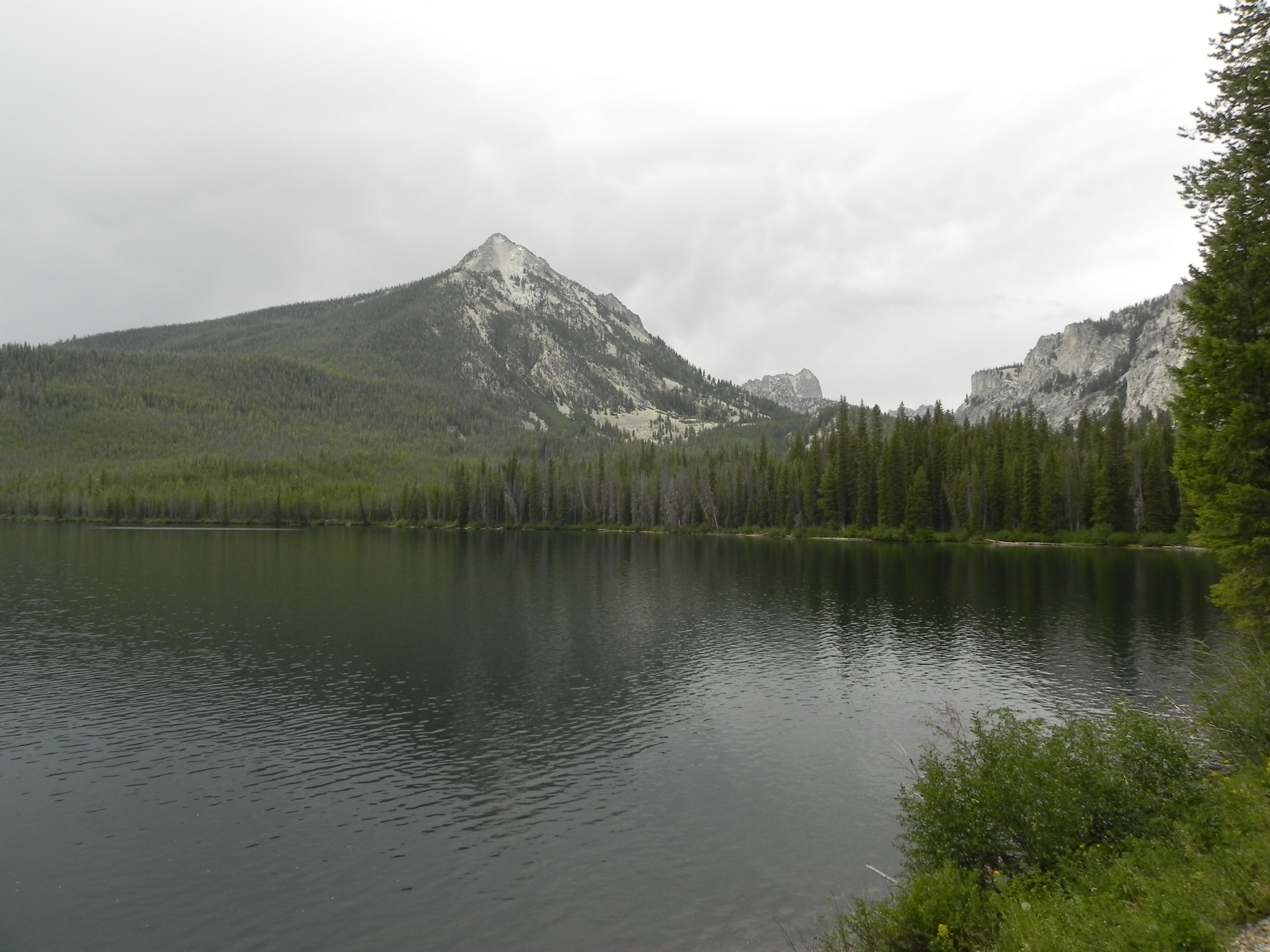
- Pettit Lake

- Location within Idaho Location within the United States
- Location: Blaine County, Idaho
- Coordinates: 43°59′N 114°53′W
- Type: Glacial
- Primary inflows: Creek from Alice Lake
- Primary outflows: Creek to Alturas Lake Creek to Salmon River
- Basin countries: United States
- Max. length: 1.40 mi (2.25 km)
- Max. width: 0.55 mi (0.89 km)
- Surface elevation: 6,996 ft (2,132 m)

Pettit Lake is a large alpine lake in Blaine County, Idaho, United States, located in the Sawtooth Valley in the Sawtooth National Recreation Area. The lake is approximately 16 miles (26 km) south of Stanley and 33 miles (53 km) northwest of Ketchum.

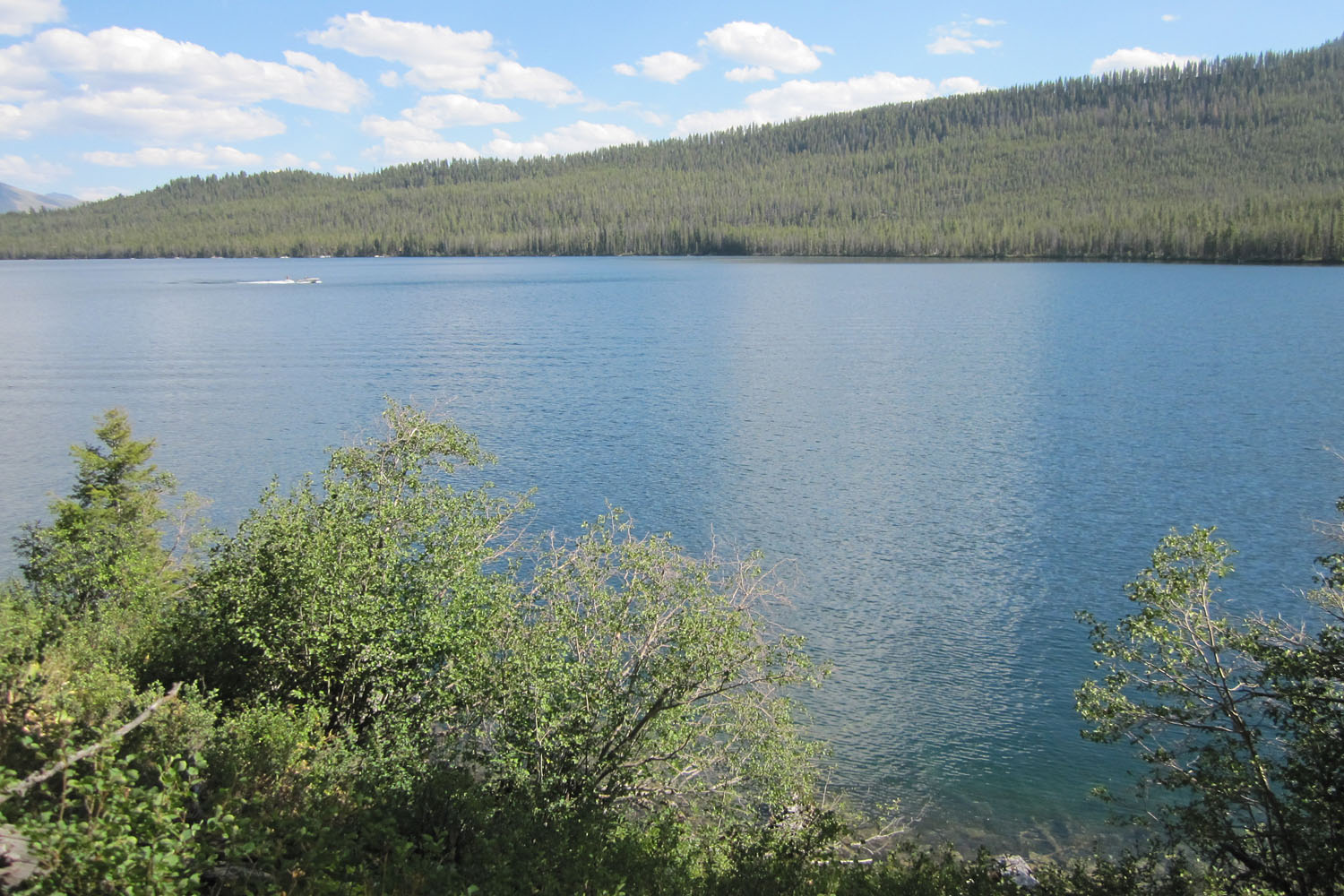
Pettit Lake

Pettit Lake is accessed from State Highway 75 via Sawtooth National Forest road 205. There are campgrounds and trailheads around Pettit Lake.

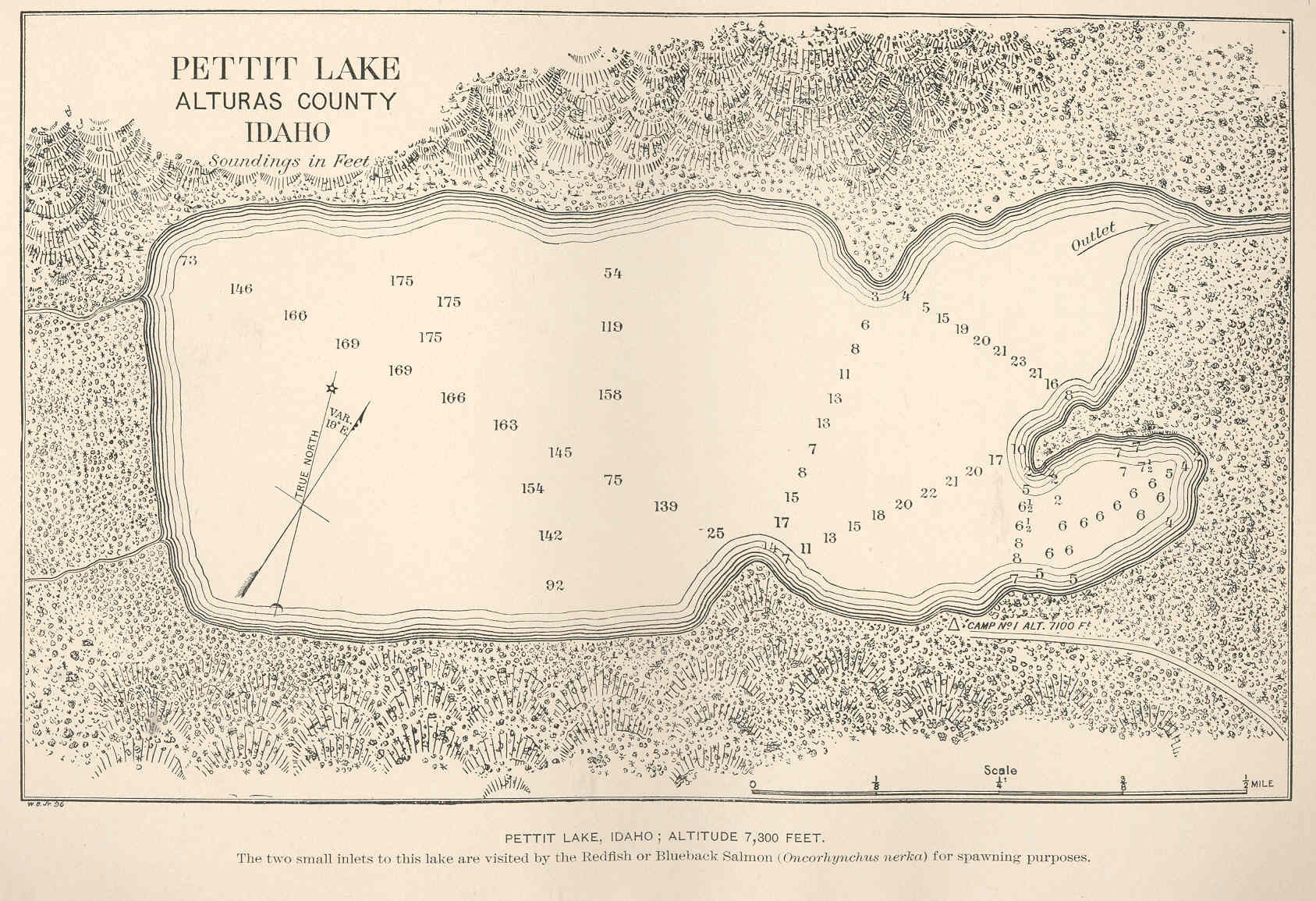
The two small inlets to this lake are visited by the Redfish or Blueback Salmon.

In the southern section of the Sawtooth Valley, Pettit Lake is the third largest lake in Sawtooth National Recreation Area. Just east of the Sawtooth Wilderness, Pettit Lake is at an elevation of 6,996 feet (2,132 m), downstream of popular destinations such as Alice Lake and the Twin Lakes.

== See also ==
- List of lakes of the Sawtooth Mountains (Idaho)
- Sawtooth National Forest
- Sawtooth National Recreation Area
- Sawtooth Range (Idaho)
