= Snowyside Peak =

Mountain in the state of Idaho

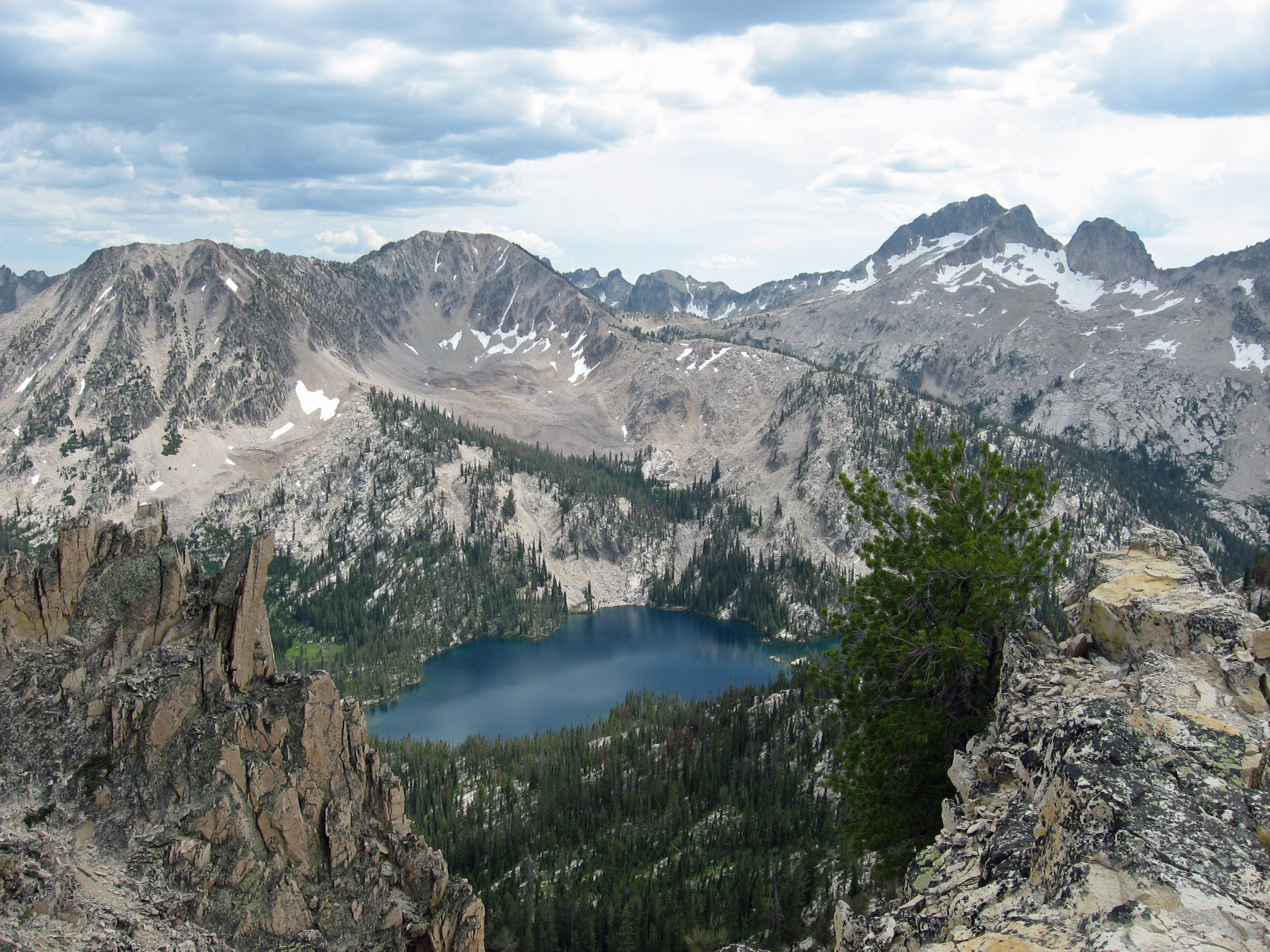
- Snowyside Peak at right with Toxaway Lake

Highest point
- Elevation: 10,651 ft (3,246 m)
- Prominence: 1,546 ft (471 m)
- Parent peak: Mount Cramer
- Coordinates: 43°56′18″N 114°58′17″W

Geography
- Location within Idaho
- Location: Blaine, Custer, and Elmore counties, Idaho, U.S.
- Parent range: Sawtooth Range
- Topo map: USGS Snowyside Peak

Climbing
- Easiest route: Scramble, class 3

Snowyside Peak, at 10,651 feet (3,246 m) above sea level, is the fifth-highest peak in the Sawtooth Range of the U.S. state of Idaho. The peak is located in the Sawtooth Wilderness of Sawtooth National Recreation Area at the intersection of Blaine, Custer County, and Elmore counties. It is the highest point in Elmore County. The peak is located 5.1 miles (8.2 km) south of Mount Cramer, its line parent. It is the 217th-highest peak in Idaho.

== See also ==
- List of peaks of the Sawtooth Range (Idaho)
- List of mountains of Idaho
- List of mountain peaks of Idaho
- List of mountain ranges in Idaho
