= Asby =

Asby may refer to:

== Places ==
England

- Asby, Cumberland, a village in Cumberland, Cumbria
- Asby, Westmorland and Furness, a civil parish in Westmorland and Furness, Cumbria
- Great Asby, a village in the district of Eden, Cumbria
- Little Asby, a village in the district of Eden, Cumbria

Sweden

- Asby, Sweden, a town
