= Ydrefors =

- Location in Sweden
- Coordinates: 57°47′30″N 15°32′40″E
- Country: Sweden
- Municipality: Småland, Östergötland
- Time zone: UTC+1 (CET)
  - Summer (DST): UTC+2 (CEST)

Ydrefors is a village in Sweden on the border between Småland and Östergötland located at the southern tip of the lake Brosjön. There, in Stångån, meet even municipalities Kinda, Vimmerby and Ydre and the Rural Municipalities of Tidersrum, Södra Vi and Svinhult.

== History ==
Between 1924 and 1940 Ydrefors and Vimmerby were connected by the narrow gauge Vimmerby Ydre rail. Ydrefors is home to Ydrefors Camping, from 1938–1969 to a Folkskolan and since the 1970s to educational facilities of Ananda Marga Gurukula.
