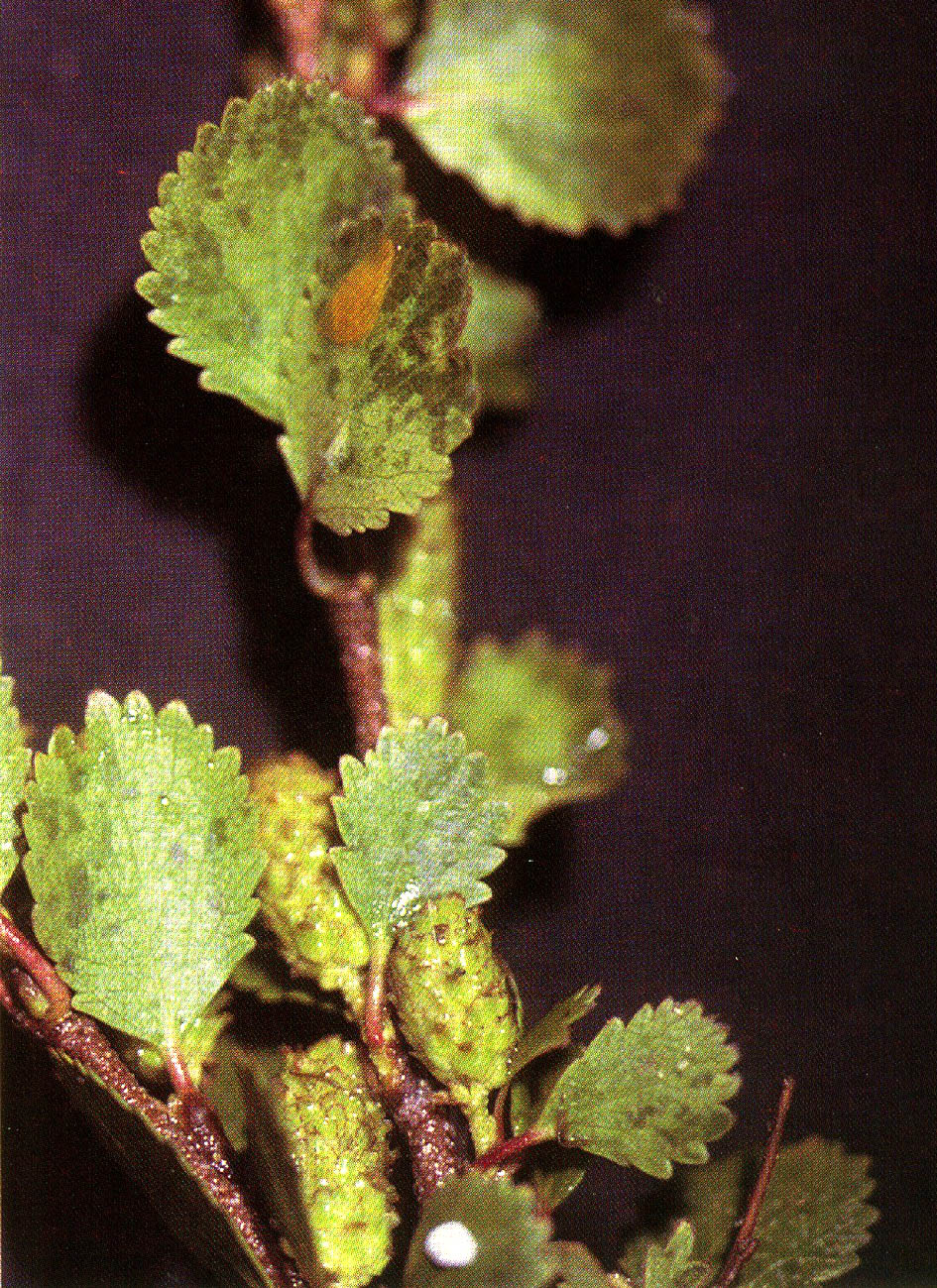

Conservation status
- Least Concern (IUCN 3.1)

Scientific classification
- Kingdom: Plantae
- Clade: Embryophytes
- Clade: Tracheophytes
- Clade: Angiosperms
- Clade: Eudicots
- Clade: Rosids
- Order: Fagales
- Family: Betulaceae
- Genus: Betula
- Subgenus: Betula subg. Chamaebetula
- Species: B. nana

Binomial name
- Betula nana L.

Synonyms
- Synonymy: Alnus nana (L.) Clairv.; Betula alba subsp. nana (L.) Bonnier & Layens; Betula crenata Rydb. ex E.J.Butler; Betula glandulosa f. intermedia Kurtz; Betula littelliana Tucker; Betula nana var. borealis Regel; Betula nana var. europaea Ledeb.; Betula nana var. flabellifolia Hook.; Betula nana var. genuina Regel, not validly publ.; Betula nana var. intermedia Regel, nom. illeg. homonym. post.; Betula nana var. macrophylla Gaudin; Betula nana f. magnifolia Hartz; Betula nana var. reducta Hultén; Betula nana f. reducta (Hultén) B.Boivin; Betula nana var. relicta Th.Fr. ex Gürke; Betula nana subsp. relicta (Th.Fr. ex Gürke) Nyman; Betula nana subsp. tundrarum (Perfil.) Á.Löve & D.Löve; Betula naniformis Lindb. ex Kindb.; Betula tundrarum Perfil.; Betula viminea Kindb.; Betula viminea var. serrulata Kindb.; Chamaebetula acutifolia Opiz; Chamaebetula nana (L.) Opiz

= Betula nana =

Dwarf birch

Species of flowering plant

Betula nana, the dwarf birch, is a species of birch in the flowering plant family Betulaceae, found mainly in the tundra of the Arctic region.

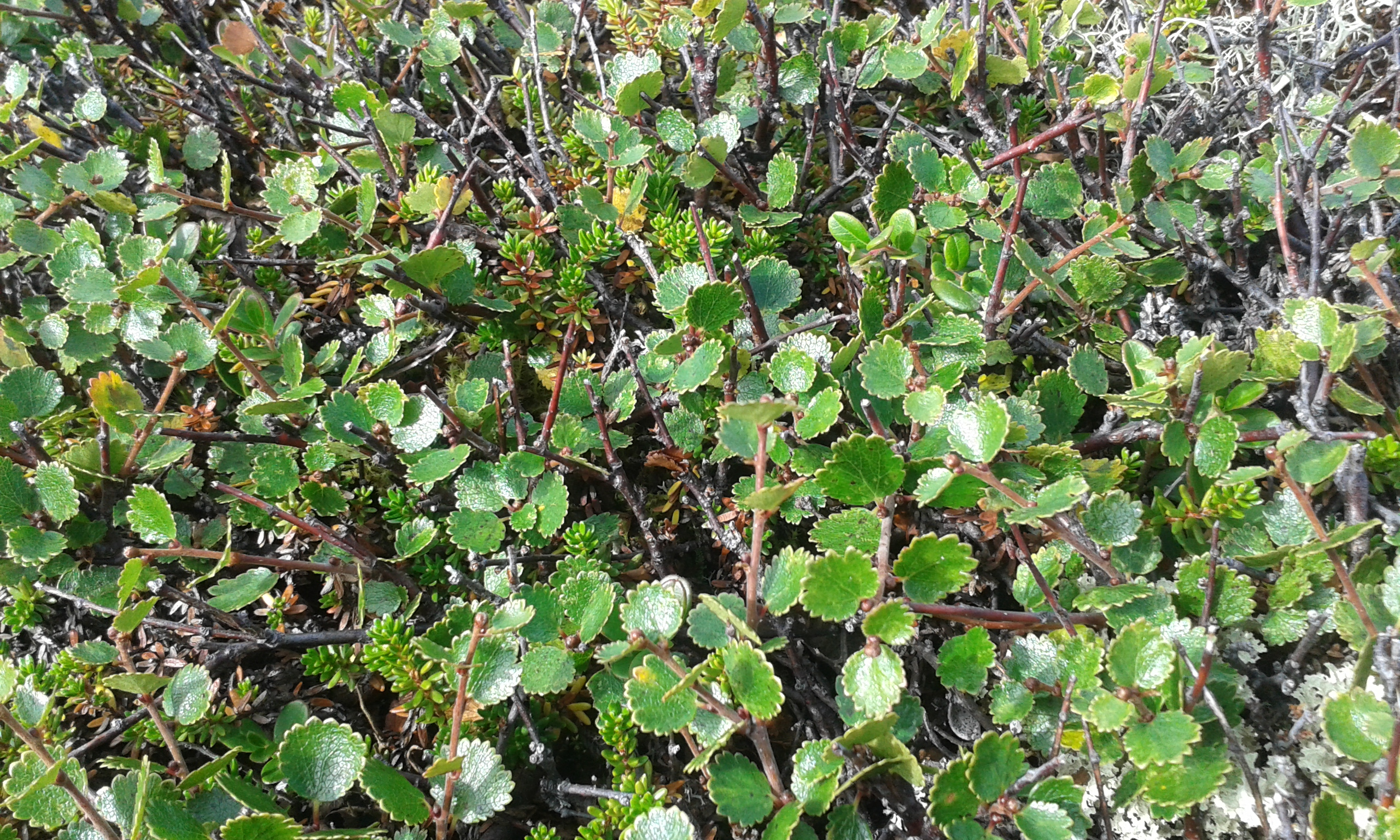
Specimen at 1000m

== Description ==
It is a monoecious, deciduous shrub growing up to 1–1.2 metres (3 ft 3 in – 3 ft 11 in) high. The bark is non-peeling and shiny red-copper colored. The leaves are rounded, 6–20 millimetres (0.24–0.79 in) diameter, with a bluntly toothed margin. The leaves are a darker green on their upper surface. Leaf growth occurs after snow melt and become red in autumn.

The wind-pollinated fruiting catkins are erect, 5–15 millimetres (0.20–0.59 in) long and 4–10 millimetres (0.16–0.39 in) broad.

== Distribution ==
Betula nana is native to arctic and cool temperate regions of Greenland, Iceland, northern Europe, northern Asia and northern North America and it will grow in a variety of conditions. Outside of far northern areas, it is usually found growing only in mountains above 300 metres (980 ft), up to 835 metres (2,740 ft) in Great Britain and 2,200 metres (7,200 ft) in the Alps and Carpathians. Its northern range limit is on Svalbard, where it is confined to favourable sites. In the UK Betula nana is at its southern range limit, with many populations having declined significantly in recent decades. In southern Sweden the occurrence of Betula nana in Sund, Ydre is deemed a glacial relict.

It generally favours wet, but well-drained sites, with a nutrient-poor, acidic soil that can be xeric and rocky. B. nana has a low tolerance for shade. In the Arctic it grows in alpine tundra, rocky barrens, and moorlands. In the Alps and Carpathians it grows in alpine tundra, subalpine damp moorlands, raised bogs with the moss Sphagnum magellanicum, and subalpine pine moors.

== Genome ==
The genome of B. nana has been sequenced.
