= Rieber & Søn =

Norwegian food manufacturing company

Rieber & Søn AS
- Company type: Aksjeselskap
- Industry: Food
- Founded: 1839
- Founder: Paul Gottlieb Rieber
- Headquarters: Bergen, Norway
- Area served: Norway
- Key people: Patrik Andersson (CEO); Helge Midttun (Chairman)
- Number of employees: 3,558 (2009)
- Parent: Orkla Group
- Website: www.rieberson.no

Rieber & Søn is a Norwegian food manufacturing company that owns and produces a wide range of products and brands. The company is based in Bergen with more than 25 brands in 12 countries, of which 7 have manufacturing plants.

Brands owned by Rieber include Toro, Denja, Mr. Lee, Vossafår, Vestlandslefsa, Geisha, Ming, Trondhjems (Norway), Mrs. Cheng’s, Frödinge (Sweden), Puttkammer & Walke (P&W) (Germany), Wolfgang Kornke's Finest Food (Austria), K-Salat, Bähncke (Denmark), Vitana (Czech Republic and Slovakia), Chaka (Russia), Cronions and Rijnhout (the Netherlands).

The company started as a trading company and vinegar plant in 1839 in Bergen. A new business area is acquired through the production of substitute coffee in 1933 and in 1946 the TORO brand is launched. In 1985 Rieber bought what would be the first of many acquired brands, Denja. Two years later it merged with the building materials companies Jacob Neumann and Nodest Industrier and floated on the Oslo Stock Exchange. Rieber entered Eastern Europe in 1992 when it bought the Czech brand Vitana. In 2000 the building materials section was sold and the company chose to concentrate only on food production.

Rieber & Søn was acquired by Orkla Group in April 2013.
