= Helena Ekblom =

Swedish preacher

Helena "Lena" Sophia Ekblom (24 June 1790 – 1859), known as Predikare-Lena ('Preacher-Lena') and Vita jungfrun ('White Maiden') was a Swedish writer and preacher.

== Life ==
Helena Ekblom was born in Mellankärr in the Sankt Anna parish in Östergötland to the sailor Jacob Ekblom (died 1804) and Brita Jansdotter (died 1806).

She claimed to have her first religious revelation at the age of nine. When her mother and her sister died shortly after each other in 1806, she had a stroke which permanently affected her movement in the left side of her body as well as her expression of speech. She also claimed to experience spiritual visions. It was these events that started her activity as a spiritual preacher. Her sermons focused on her own apocalyptic visions of the bliss of the virtuous and the punishment of the sinful. Her sermons became popular and attracted large crowds, and she began to wander around to conduct them and became a travelling preacher. Lena Ekblom was known to be very particular about her dress and insisted to always conduct her sermons spotlessly dressed in white, which is why she came to be popularly referred to as Vita jungfrun or 'White Maiden'.

In the early 19th-century, religious activity outside of the state church was banned in accordance with the Conventicle Act, and the authorities eventually took an interest in her activity when her followers became many enough to cause unrest. In 1807, she was arrested. When the clergy failed to convince her to adjust to the church doctrine, she was placed in the Vadstena Lunatic asylum. She escaped the same night she was placed there and continued her sermons. She attracted followers also among people of higher social standing. She also attracted enemies and was on at least one occasion subjected to violence. She was arrested and taken to Kalmar, but released. In August 1808, she was again taken to the Vadstena mental asylum, and this time chained to unable her to escape. She was treated leniently enough for her to write her work Den andeliga striden, which was her autobiography and a description of five spiritual visions. In 1810, she was released from the chains as well as any harsh treatment by order of the king, though she was not released.

In 1828, she was finally released from the asylum, and resumed her activity as a travelling preacher. She was still dressed in white during her sermons. During this time, she was reportedly visibly marked from the abuse to which she was subjected in the asylum, but she also subjected herself to an ascetic lifestyle, such as insisting on sleeping on the floor. She regarded her visions and dreams as divine apparitions, which gave her the call and the right to contribute to the Kingdom of God on Earth. Ekblom are often characterized as a representative of the so-called "preaching illness" of her time, and gathered followers who contributed to the growing Christian revival in 19th-century Sweden.

In 1846, the Svinhult parish granted Helena Ekblom an annual pension, and from 1853, she lived at the Svinhult poor house. During her last years, she became confused, and she died by freezing to death in the snow in the winter of 1859.

Ekblom has been described in history both as dangerous as well as a Christian martyr. Her book was published in several editions until 1920.

== In fiction ==
Helena Ekblom is the subject of a novel: Predikare-Lena ('Preacher-Lena') by Tore Zetterholm, (1974).

She has been suggested as a possible role model for the title character of the novel Amorina by Carl Jonas Love Almqvist (1822).

== Works ==
- Den andeliga striden, wälment författad af Jungfru Helena Sophia Ekblom ('The spiritual battle, written in well-meaning by Maiden Helena Sophia Ekblom')
