= Great Asby =

Village in Cumbria, England

Coordinates: 54.513°N 2.495°W

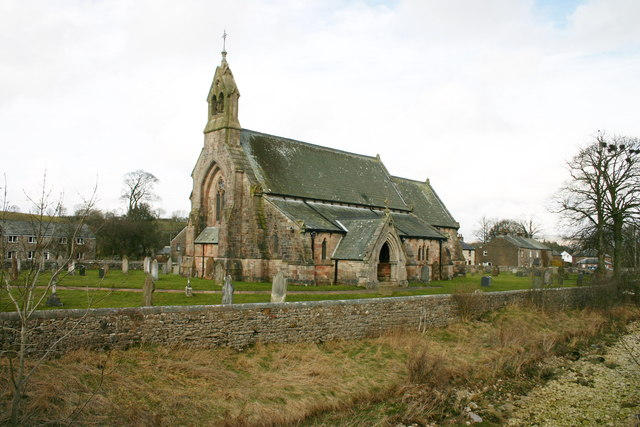
- St. Peter's Church, Great Asby

- Location in former Eden District, Cumbria Location within Cumbria
- OS grid reference: NY679132
- Civil parish: Asby
- Unitary authority: Westmorland and Furness
- Ceremonial county: Cumbria
- Region: North West
- Country: England
- Sovereign state: United Kingdom
- Post town: APPLEBY-IN-WESTMORLAND
- Postcode district: CA16
- Dialling code: 017683
- Police: Cumbria
- Fire: Cumbria
- Ambulance: North West
- UK Parliament: Westmorland and Lonsdale
- Website: http://asbyparish.org.uk

Great Asby is a village in Cumbria, England. Historically part of Westmorland, it is located approximately 15 miles (24 km) south east of Penrith and approximately 5 miles (8.0 km) south of Appleby-in-Westmorland. Its name is said to be derived from the Old Norse: askr, meaning ash and by, meaning farm.

In present times the village is used mainly by the farming community.

The village's church is St Peter's Church, which was built between 1863 and 1866.

== Geography ==
Asby Beck runs through the middle of Great Asby although this gill tends more commonly to be dry except after heavy rain.

Located about 2 1/2 miles (4.0 km) south west of the village is Great Asby Scar, which has been declared a national nature reserve, partly due to its limestone geology and also the flora that grow in its limestone pavement areas.

== See also ==
- Listed buildings in Asby, Westmorland and Furness
- Asby, Westmorland and Furness (civil parish)
- Little Asby
- Pate Hole

Yorkshire Dales National Park Great Asby included August 2016

Westmorland Way Great Asby is on the Appleby to Arnside walking route

Westmorland Dales Great Asby is in the Westmorland Dales
