= Helge Midttun =

Norwegian businessman

Helge Midttun (born 1955) is a Norwegian businessperson and since 2006 CEO of Aker BioMarine and Chairman of Rieber & Søn.

Midttun graduated from the Norwegian School of Economics and Business Administration in 1979. He worked for Authur Andersen & Co. (1979-81), Schlumberger (1981-85) before becoming CEO of Scanvest Ring (1986-89). He started working for Rieber & Søn in 1990, and was hired as CEO of Stento (1996-99). He has since been CEO of Det Norske Veritas (2000-02), Fjord Seafood (2003-06) and Aker BioMarine (2006-).

Business positions
Preceded by Sven Ullring	Chief executive officer of Det Norske Veritas; 2000–2002	Succeeded by Miklos Konkoly-Thege
