= Listed buildings in Asby, Westmorland and Furness =

Asby is a civil parish in Westmorland and Furness, Cumbria, England. It contains 22 buildings that are recorded in the National Heritage List for England. Of these, one is listed at Grade I, the highest of the three grades, four are at Grade II*, the middle grade, and the others are at Grade II, the lowest grade. The parish contains the small villages of Great Asby and Little Asby, and is otherwise almost completely rural. Most of the listed buildings are houses and associated structures, farmhouses and farm buildings. The other listed buildings comprise a church, a lych gate, almshouses, a roadbridge, a footbridge, and two wells.

== Key ==
Grade	Criteria
I	Buildings of exceptional interest, sometimes considered to be internationally important
II*	Particularly important buildings of more than special interest
II	Buildings of national importance and special interest

== Buildings ==
Name and location	Photograph	Date	Notes	Grade
Well, Grange Hall; 54.49238°N 2.48696°W	—	Medieval	This consists of a well house over a spring. It is built in stone with an entrance on the east side, and it has a stone roof with a stone with cruciform moulding closing the ridge. The spring rises through a square opening in the floor. The well house is surrounded by a drystone wall with an opening facing the entrance.	II*
Grange Hall and adjoining buildings 54.49256°N 2.48840°W		14th century	This originated as a tower house and a grange of Byland Abbey. It is in stone with quoins, a parapet, and a slate roof. The main part has three storeys and four bays, and there are wings to the front and the back. In the east front is a 15th-century five-light oriel window, and most of the other windows are mullioned.	I
Old Rectory; 54.51262°N 2.49504°W	—	14th century	The former rectory originated as a solar tower, the hall range was added probably in the 17th century, and an extension to the south was added in 1866. The house is in stone with a slate roof, and has a U-shaped plan. The tower has thick walls, a massive plinth, quoins, a tunnel vault and a chamfered doorway with a hood mould. In the gable end is a two-light arched window with Geometrical tracery, and the other windows have flat tops and mullions.	II*
Gaythorne Hall; 54.51360°N 2.54268°W		c. 1600	A large house on an isolated site, in stone with quoins and a slate roof. It has a square plan, with projecting stair towers on the sides. The entrance front has two storeys with a cellar and attics, five bays, and a central two-storey porch with a round-headed entrance and a moulded surround. At the rear the house has three storeys and a single-storey porch. The windows are mullioned or mullioned and transomed, and some have hood moulds.	II*
Barn, Fell View Farm; 54.48100°N 2.46675°W	—	17th century	Originally a house, later converted into a farm building. It is in stone with quoins and a slate roof. The original door has a false four-centred head. External steps lead up to a loft door. All the windows have chamfered stone surrounds and mullions.	II
Elm Tree Old Farmhouse and byre 54.51313°N 2.49625°W	—	1694	A barn was added to the left of the farmhouse in the end of the 18th century, and a kitchen was added to the right in the early 19th century. The buildings are in stone with a slate roof and have two storeys. The original part is on a large plinth, it has three bays and a central door with a dated and initialled lintel.	II
Asby Hall, area railings and gate 54.51374°N 2.49167°W	—	1694	A house, enlarged in the mid-18th century, in stone with quoins and a slate roof, incorporating earlier 17th-century material. There are three storeys and a symmetrical front of three bays. The central doorway has Tuscan pilasters, and a segmental head with a coat of arms above. The windows are sashes. The area in front of the house has a low wall with railings, and a central double gate with an ornate overthrow.	II*
White House; 54.51267°N 2.49689°W	—	1748	A stone house that has been divided into two dwellings, with quoins, a slate roof, and two storeys. The original house has four bays, three sash windows in each floor, and an inscribed dated panel above the door. At the rear is a rendered gabled extension. To the right of the original house is a former byre with two casement windows in the lower floor and one above. On the east front are external steps leading up to a first floor doorway.	II
Low Whygill Head Farmhouse and barn 54.49156°N 2.45824°W	—	1749	The farmhouse and outbuildings are in stone with roofs of slate or corrugated iron. Some of the windows are mullioned, others are 20th-century casements. Above a doorway is an initialled and dated panel. Adjacent to the house is a byre and external steps leading to a hayloft above.	II
Byre range, northeast of Asby Hall; 54.51394°N 2.49157°W	—	Mid 18th century	The farm building is in stone with quoins, and it has a slate roof with a stone ridge. The building is in a single storey, and it contains two doors and four windows.	II
Barn range, northwest of Asby Hall; 54.51383°N 2.49204°W	—	Mid 18th century	A range of farm buildings in stone with a slate roof that has stone copings and a stone ridge. There are 1 1/2 storeys, and the range contains wagon entrances, doors with hood moulds, loft doors, and windows.	II
High Whygill Head Farmhouse and barn 54.49158°N 2.46114°W		1774	The farmhouse is pebbledashed with a slate roof, and has two storeys and a symmetrical three-bay front. The central doorway has pilasters and a segmental canopy. It is flanked by three-light mullioned windows, and in the upper floor are two two-light windows. At the rear is a wing that continues as a byre with a hayloft above. In the gable is a datestone and dove holes.	II
Barn, Grange Hall; 54.49257°N 2.48801°W	—	Late 18th century	The barn, to the east of the hall, was extended to the north in the late 19th century. It is in stone with a slate roof, and has a later outshut at the south end. The openings include doorways and a later garage door.	II
St Helen's Almshouses; 54.51400°N 2.49321°W		1811	A stone building divided into four almshouses, the main block is square, with quoins, two storeys and a pyramidal slate roof. On the north and south sides are two sash windows in each floor. On the east and west sides is a single-storey lean-to with a hipped roof, four sash windows, and doors on the sides. On the west front is an inscribed panel.	II
Byre/barn, southeast of Asby Hall; 54.51366°N 2.49126°W	—	Early 19th century	The farm building is in stone with quoins and a slate roof. It has two storeys, two plank doors, and a segmental-headed wagon door with a loft door above.	II
Fell View Farmhouse and adjoining buildings 54.48115°N 2.46687°W	—	Early 19th century	A rendered stone farmhouse that has a slate roof with stone copings. There are two storeys and three bays. On the front is a doorway, a two-light mullioned window to the right, a traceried stair window with a semicircular head, imposts, and a keystone, and two sash windows in the upper floor. At the rear is a door with a wooden cornice on consoles. To the north is a group of outbuildings, and to the south is a store, both of which have wagon entries with segmental heads.	II
Wall, railings and gate posts, Asby Hall; 54.51407°N 2.49208°W	—	Mid 19th century (probable)	The gateway is flanked by rusticated stone piers with cornices. These are linked to similar end piers by a low wall with cast iron railings.	II
Footbridge over Dale Beck; 54.51105°N 2.49827°W		Mid 19th century	The bridge carries a footpath over a stream. It consists of large stone slabs, and has massive abutments and low parapets. The footway is between 2 feet (0.61 m) and 3 feet (0.91 m) wide.	II
St Peter's Church; 54.51338°N 2.49494°W		1865–66	The church was built on the site of an earlier church and was designed by W. and J. Hay in Gothic Revival style. It is built in sandstone with stepped buttresses and has a slate roof with stone copings. The church consists of a nave, a south aisle with an ornate porch, and a chancel. At the west end is a bellcote carried on an arch round the west window.	II
Lychgate; 54.51328°N 2.49537°W		1866	The lychgate is at the entrance to the churchyard of St Peter's Church. It has braced wooden uprights supporting a hipped slate roof with open gablets and wrought iron crosses. The gates are wooden with wrought iron fittings.	II
Bridge over Potts Beck; 54.49263°N 2.44498°W	—	1875	The bridge carries a road over a stream. It is in stone and consists of a single span with a segmental arch. In the parapet is an inscribed and dated parish boundary stone.	II
St Helen's Well; 54.51382°N 2.49305°W		Uncertain	A rectangular enclosure around a spring. On three sides there is a wall with a sandstone coping surmounted by limestone flags, and in the north wall is a wrought iron gate. Water rises from a large rectangular opening, and leaves by two outlets.	II
