= Torpa, Ydre =

Torpa
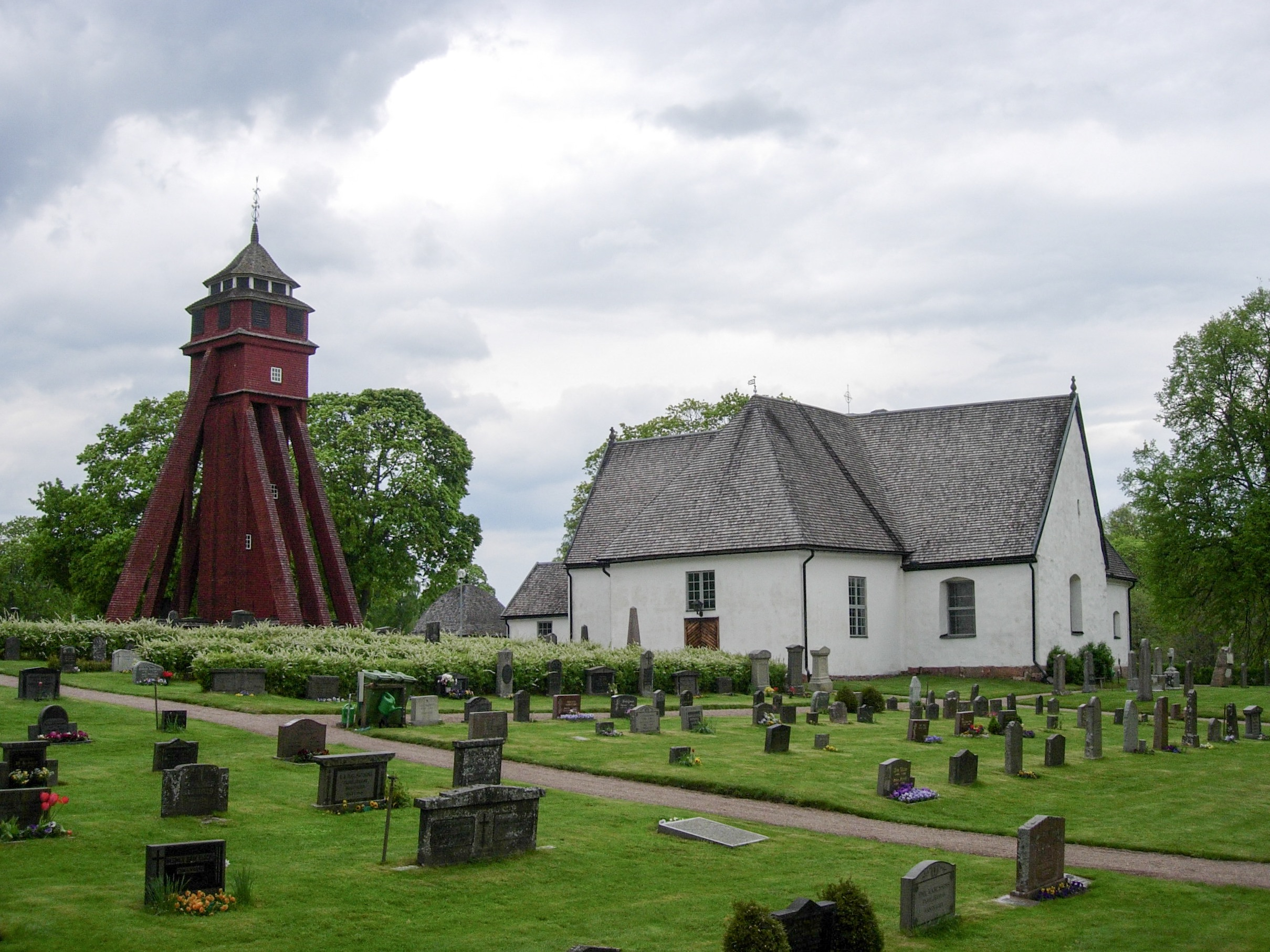
- Torpa church

- Location within Östergötland Location within Sweden
- Coordinates: 57.962°N 15.1438°E
- Country: Sweden
- County: Östergötland
- Municipality: Ydre
- Time zone: UTC+1 (CET)
  - Summer (DST): UTC+2 (CEST)

Torpa is a village in Ydre Municipality, Östergötland County. It lies in the traditional province of Östergötland along the shores of Lake Sommen the in South Swedish highlands. According to Svenskt ortnamnslexikon the name of the locality is first attested in 1281 as Thorpum, possibly in reference as "new settlement".
