= Toro (Norwegian company) =

Norwegian food company

- Current owner: Orkla Group
- Country: Norway
- Markets: Norway, Iceland, Norway-Sweden border
- Registered as a trademark in: January 8, 1946
- Website: https://www.toro.no/

Toro is a Norwegian manufacturer and brand of sauces, soups and other similar products. Owned by Orkla Group, who bought it from the founders Rieber & Søn, the production plant is based in Indre Arna in Bergen and sold 140 million consumption units divided between 750 products. Of the 900 employees, 350 work at the plant in Indre Arna.

The Toro brand was launched in 1946 with the production of meat bouillon. Toro is Spanish for ox and registered in 1964. Three years later it moved from Nøstet to Arna. There have been nine expansions of the production plant since the start.

Toro products sold in Norway, include soups (tomato soup, cauliflower soup, fish soup), sauces (béarnaise sauce, hollandaise, gravy, tomato sauce, chicken sauce, champignon sauce), instant cup meals, lasagna, stroganoff, chicken tikka masala, rice, hot chocolate, waffles, other cake mixes, and seasoning. Their products are usually sold in powderbags, with a few sold as microwave meals or cup meals. They are also considered the inventors of gryterett (lit. saucepan meal), where rice or pasta, meat or chicken, seasoning, water and small vegetables (and occasionally beans and champignon) are boiled together, in contrast to e.g. chili con carne where the rice and stew are boiled separately.

Toro is also present in Iceland, with a selection of their Norwegian products, alongside a small handful of Iceland-exclusive products like leek soup and curry sauce.

A small selection of gryterett and sauce products are available in some Swedish grocery stores near the Norway-Sweden border, primarily ones that cater to Norwegian visitors.
