= Sund, Ydre =

Sund
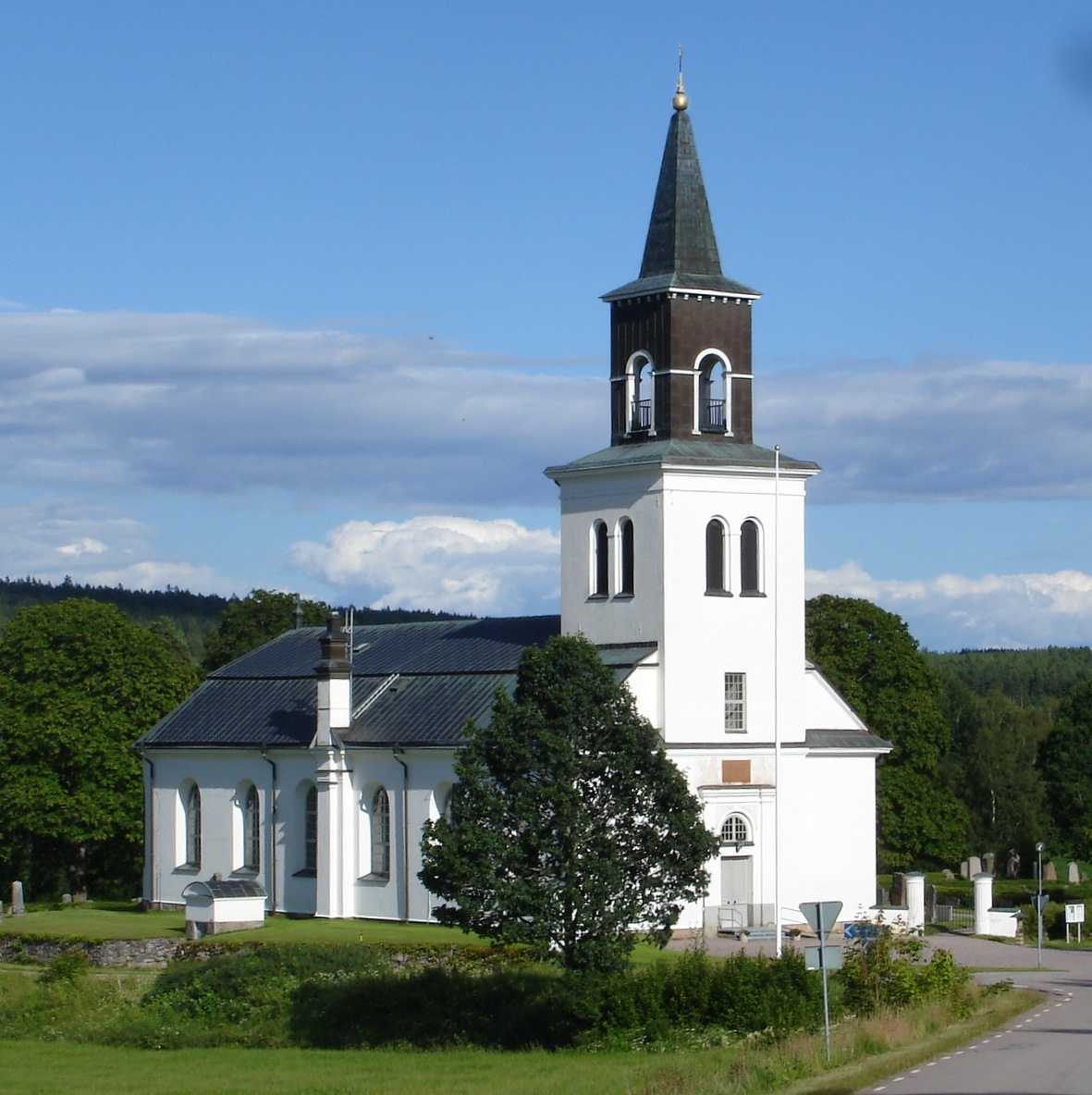
- Church of Sund

- Location within Östergötland Location within Sweden
- Coordinates: 57.862778°N 15.246111°E
- Country: Sweden
- County: Östergötland
- Municipality: Ydre
- Time zone: UTC+1 (CET)
  - Summer (DST): UTC+2 (CEST)

Sund is a hamlet in Ydre Municipality in the South Swedish highlands. According to Svenskt ortnamnslexikon the name of the locality means "narrow" referring to its position at the bottleneck position between Norra Sundsjön and Södra Sundsjön.

According to Leonhard Fredrik Rääf the church in Sund was built in the 12th century. This church is described by Rääf as having stone arches, however it burned down in arson in 1631 and was rebuilt shortly afterward.
