= Storebro =

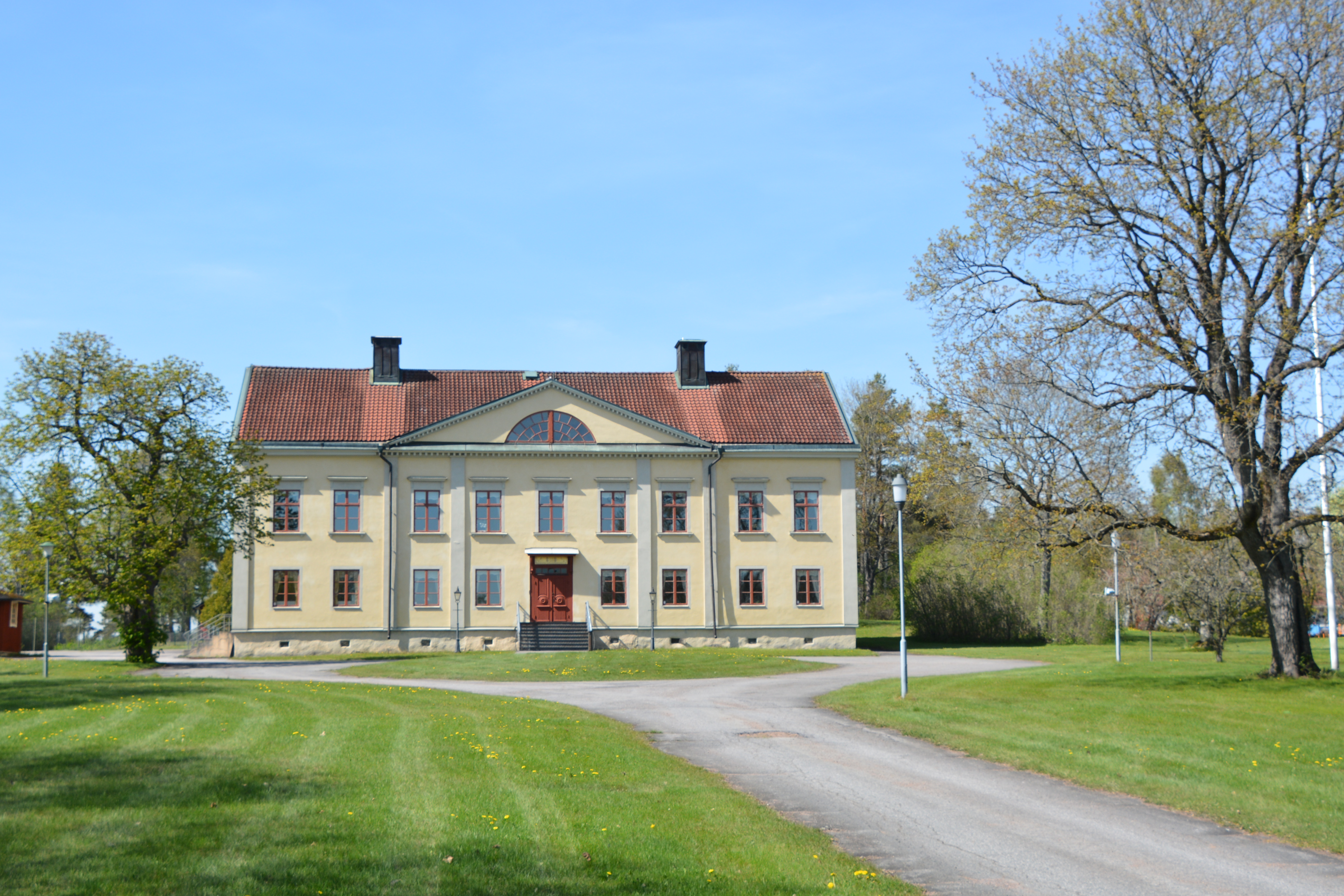

- Location within Kalmar Location within Sweden
- Coordinates: 57°35′N 15°51′E
- Country: Sweden
- Province: Småland
- County: Kalmar County
- Municipality: Vimmerby Municipality

Area
  - Total: 1.42 km^{2} (0.55 sq mi)

Population (31 December 2010)
  - Total: 972
  - Density: 686/km^{2} (1,780/sq mi)
- Time zone: UTC+1 (CET)
  - Summer (DST): UTC+2 (CEST)
- Climate: Cfb

Storebro is a locality situated in Vimmerby Municipality, Kalmar County, Sweden with 972 inhabitants in 2010.

Internationally it is best known for being the home of yacht maker Storebro Bruks AB.
