= Hestra, Ydre =

Hestra
- Location within Östergötland Location within Sweden
- Coordinates: 57°57′N 15°04′E
- Country: Sweden
- Province: Östergötland
- County: Östergötland County
- Municipality: Ydre Municipality

Area
  - Total: 0.70 km^{2} (0.27 sq mi)

Population (31 December 2020)
  - Total: 473
  - Density: 680/km^{2} (1,800/sq mi)
- Time zone: UTC+1 (CET)
  - Summer (DST): UTC+2 (CEST)

Hestra is a locality situated in Ydre Municipality, Östergötland County, Sweden with 476 inhabitants in 2010.
