= Österbymo =

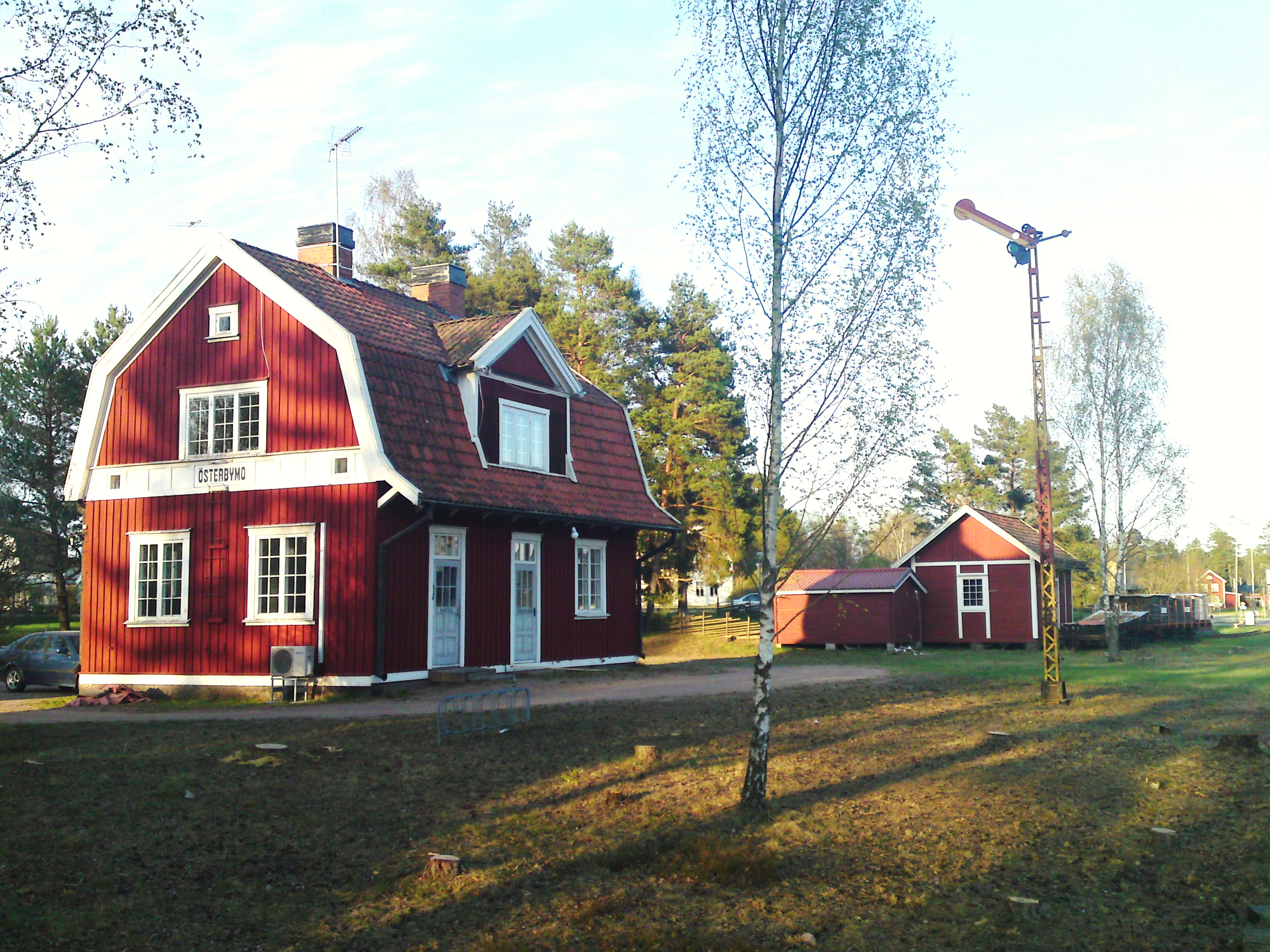
- Former Österbymo Train Station. The rail tracks have been demolished.

- Location within Östergötland Location within Sweden
- Coordinates: 57°50′N 15°16′E
- Country: Sweden
- Province: Östergötland
- County: Östergötland County
- Municipality: Ydre Municipality

Area
  - Total: 1.44 km^{2} (0.56 sq mi)

Population (31 December 2020)
  - Total: 900
  - Density: 630/km^{2} (1,600/sq mi)
- Time zone: UTC+1 (CET)
  - Summer (DST): UTC+2 (CEST)

Österbymo is a locality and the seat of Ydre Municipality, Östergötland County, Sweden with 834 inhabitants in 2010. It is the smallest municipal seat in Sweden.
