= Pate Hole =

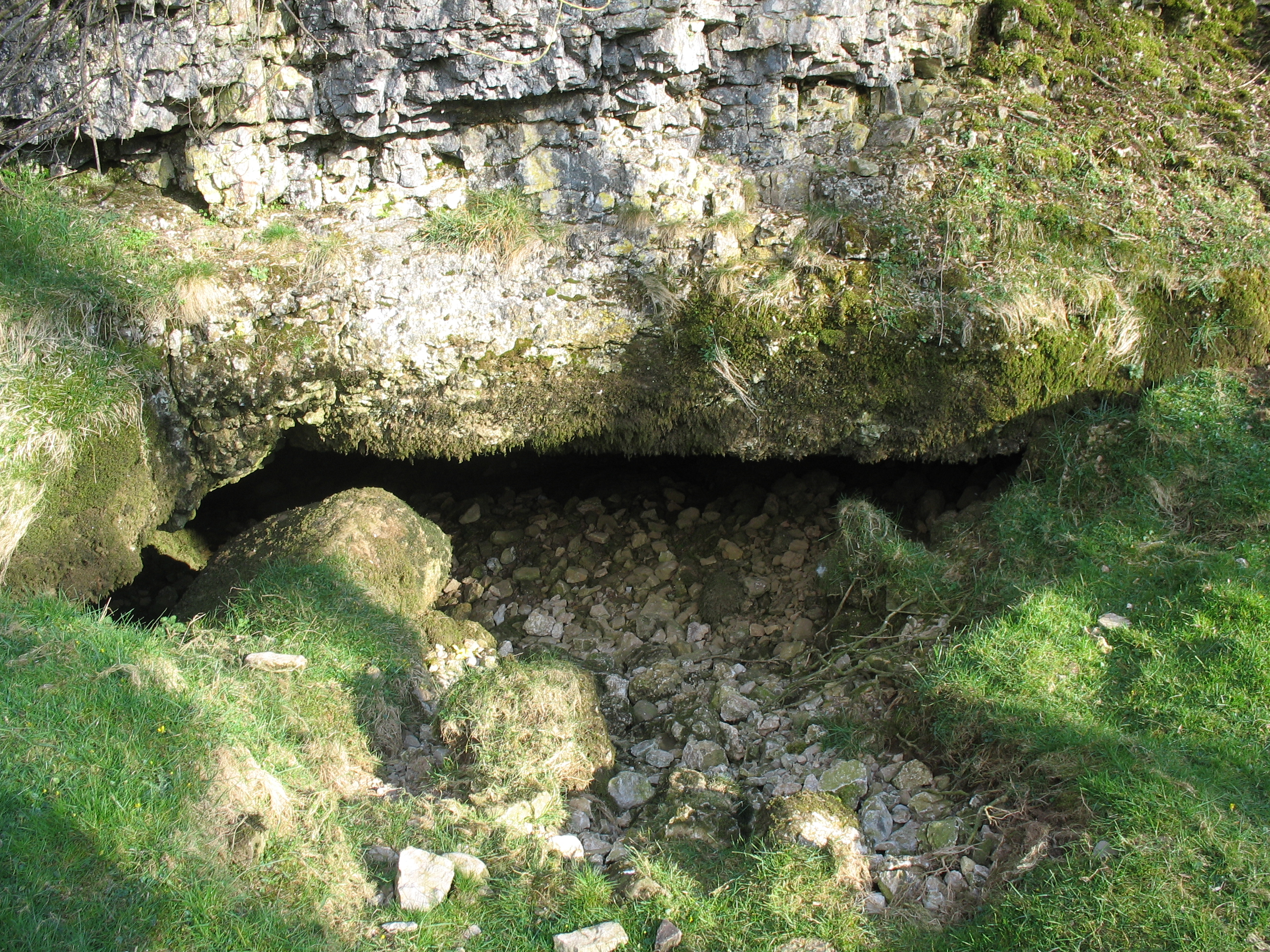
- The entrance to Pate Hole

- Location within Cumbria
- Location: Great Asby, Cumbria, England
- OS grid: NY 678 121
- Coordinates: 54°30′13″N 2°29′53″W
- Depth: 33 metres (108 ft)
- Length: 970 metres (3,180 ft)
- Elevation: 195 metres (640 ft)
- Geology: Carboniferous limestone
- Entrances: 1
- Difficulty: III
- Hazards: flooding
- Cave survey: On Cavemaps

Pate Hole is a solutional cave located adjacent to Asby Gill 1 kilometre (0.62 mi) south of Great Asby in Cumbria, England. It is 970 metres (3,180 ft) long and has a vertical range of 33 metres (108 ft). The entrance is normally dry, but in flood it becomes an impressive resurgence. Its name derives from the north country word for badger.

It consists of three main passages. From the entrance a stooping height passage heading south-east reaches a large 6 metres (20 ft) deep pool after 330 metres (1,080 ft) from which a stream emerges. This flows down a low passage to the north for some 270 metres (890 ft) where a sump is reached. The third main passage continues south underwater from the pool for 225 metres (738 ft) at a depth of 27 metres (89 ft) where it reaches a junction and becomes too restricted.

The cave is formed in Carboniferous limestone, and is thought to drain the Great Asby Scar area 3 kilometres (1.9 mi) to the south-west. The resurgence is presumed to be St. Thomas's Well in Great Asby.

The main part of the cave has been known for a long time, and it was an object of curiosity in the nineteenth century. A brief foray into it was described in The Gentleman's Magazine in 1791, and a description appeared in The Monthly Magazine in 1802. The first full description complete with passage lengths appeared in 1813. The first account of an exploration by cavers was in 1941 by members of the Yorkshire Ramblers' Club, and in November 1946 it was surveyed by a group from Appleby Grammar School led by Brian Price. The upstream sump was first dived for about 10 metres (33 ft) to a descending rift in 1960 by members of the Cave Diving Group, at which time the main part of the cave was re-surveyed by Warburton et alia. Further exploration took place in 1975-1976 by members of the same group to reach the current limit.
