= Rydsnäs =

- Location within Östergötland Location within Sweden
- Coordinates: 57°48′N 15°10′E
- Country: Sweden
- Province: Östergötland
- County: Östergötland County
- Municipality: Ydre Municipality

Area
  - Total: 0.75 km^{2} (0.29 sq mi)

Population (31 December 2020)
  - Total: 282
  - Density: 380/km^{2} (970/sq mi)
- Time zone: UTC+1 (CET)
  - Summer (DST): UTC+2 (CEST)

Rydsnäs is a locality situated in Ydre Municipality, Östergötland County, Sweden with 277 inhabitants in 2010.
