= Norra Vi =

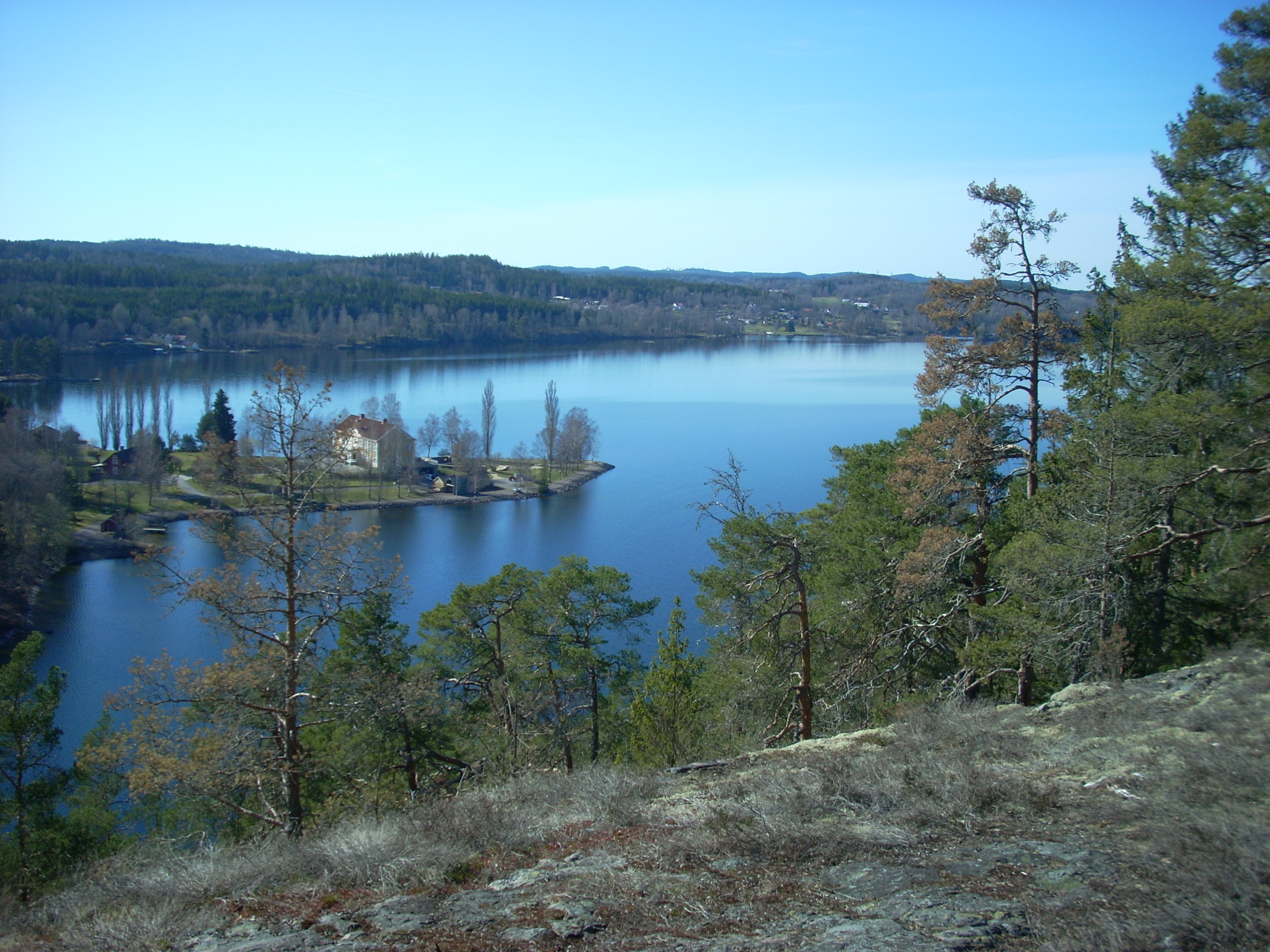
- Norra Vi to the left, April 2019.

- Location within Östergötland Location within Sweden
- Coordinates: 57.885°N 15.350278°E
- Country: Sweden
- County: Östergötland
- Municipality: Ydre
- Time zone: UTC+1 (CET)
  - Summer (DST): UTC+2 (CEST)

Norra Vi is a village at the end of the southeastern arm of Lake Sommen in South Swedish highlands. Administratively it belongs to Ydre Municipality and Östergötland County. According to Svenskt ortnamnslexikon the name of the locality loosely mean "northern place of worship". Tens of kilometers to the southeast lies Södra Vi.
