= Sven Ullring =

Norwegian engineer and businessperson (born 1935)

Sven Bang Ullring (born 16 December 1935) is a Norwegian engineer and businessperson.

He was born in Hammerfest. He attended school in Kabul from 1952 to 1953. He took his higher education in Zurich and Lausanne. From 1962 to 1982 he worked in Swedish construction company Skånska. He was then hired as CEO of Norconsult. There he spent large periods of time working abroad, including in Oman, Iraq, Bangladesh, Nigeria, Tanzania, the UAE and Sri Lanka. In 1985 he was hired as the new CEO of Det Norske Veritas. He announced his resignration in 1999, with effect from 2000.

After becoming a pensioner, he started studying Asian languages at the University of Oslo. He was also chairman of Transparency International's Norwegian branch and a board member of the Fridtjof Nansen Institute. At the University of Oslo he was the students' representative in the Department of Culture Studies and Oriental Languages board. He was also a board member of Singaporean company Keppel Offshore & Marine, as the only non-Asian. He also chaired the electoral committees in Norsk Hydro and Storebrand. He has also been the chair of Postverket and a board member of Schlumberger Inc, Norges Eksportråd and the Confederation of Norwegian Enterprise; he became a board member of Horten Verft already in 1984. He is also a fellow of the Norwegian Academy of Technological Sciences.

Business positions
Preceded by Egil Abrahamsen	Chief executive officer of Det Norske Veritas; 1985–2000	Succeeded by Helge Midttun
