= Leonhard Fredrik Rääf =

Swedish writer (1786–1872)

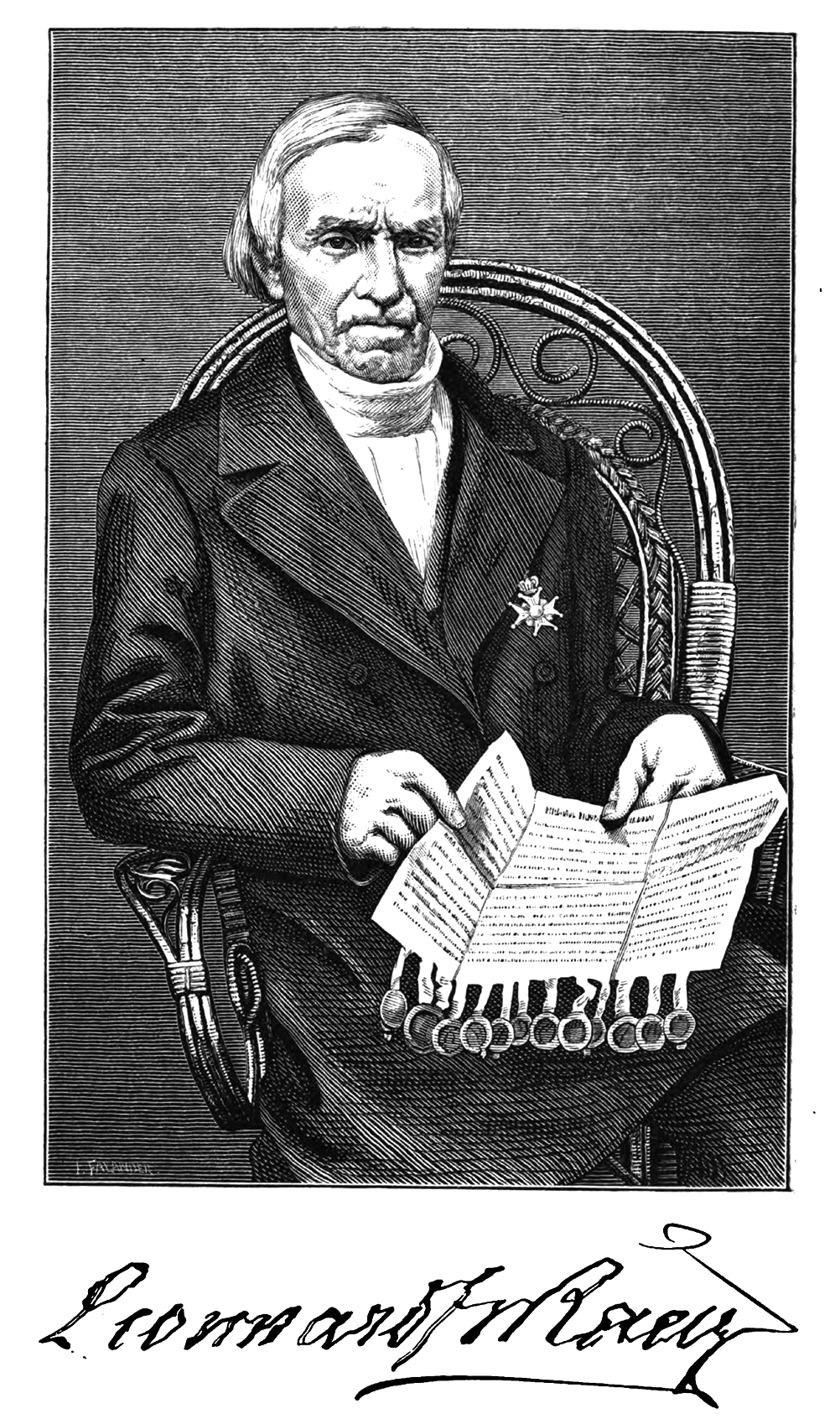
- 1870 drawing of Leonhard Fredrik Rääf
- Born: 1786; Tomestorp, Kisa
- Died: 1872 (aged 85–86)
- Citizenship: Sweden
- Education: Upsala University
- Known for: Studies of Ydre
- Scientific career
- Fields: Folkloristics, Local history
- Workplaces: National Archives of Sweden; Krigsexpeditionen

Leonhard Fredrik Rääf (1786–1872) also known as Ydredrotten was a Swedish folklorist, local historian and conservative politician from Ydre. During a time Rääf had a literary salon in Tomestorp which was frequented by among others Per Daniel Amadeus Atterbom. In 1843 Rääf moved to a farm in Forsnäs where he lived until his death in 1872.

Rääf is buried together with some possessions in a Viking-style mound at the shores of Lägern.
