= Asby, Westmorland and Furness =

Civil parish in Cumbria, England

Coordinates: 54.506°N 2.478°W

Asby
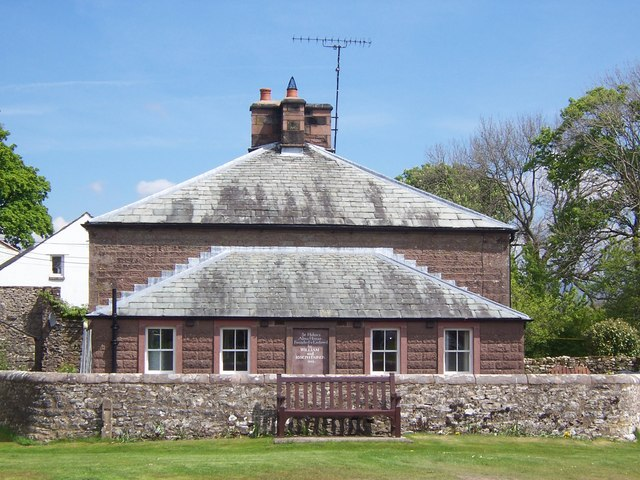
- St Helens Alms House, Great Asby

- Location within Cumbria
- Population: 309 (2011)
- OS grid reference: NY6813
- Civil parish: Asby
- Unitary authority: Westmorland and Furness
- Ceremonial county: Cumbria
- Region: North West
- Country: England
- Sovereign state: United Kingdom
- Post town: APPLEBY IN WESTMORLAND
- Postcode district: CA16
- Dialling code: 017683
- Police: Cumbria
- Fire: Cumbria
- Ambulance: North West
- UK Parliament: Westmorland and Lonsdale

Asby is a civil parish in the Westmorland and Furness district of Cumbria, England. Historically part of Westmorland, it includes the villages of Great Asby and Little Asby. According to the 2001 census the parish had a population of 280, and this had increased to 309 at the 2011 Census.

== See also ==
- Listed buildings in Asby, Westmorland and Furness
