= Asby, Sweden =

Asby
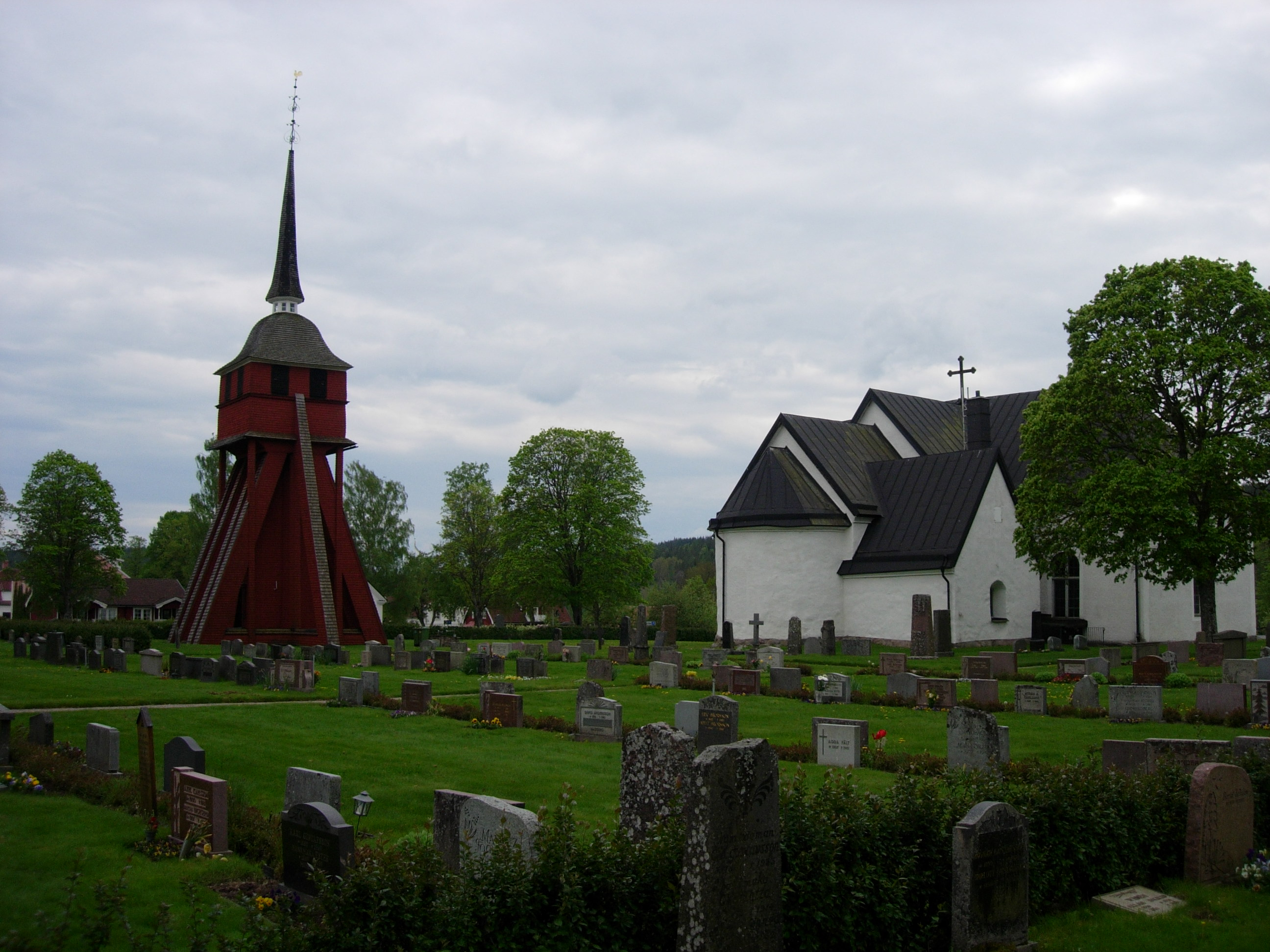
- Asby church

- Location within Östergötland Location within Sweden
- Coordinates: 57.902778°N 15.2075°E
- Country: Sweden
- County: Östergötland
- Municipality: Ydre
- Time zone: UTC+1 (CET)
  - Summer (DST): UTC+2 (CEST)

Asby is a village in Ydre Municipality, Östergötland County. It lies in the traditional province of Östergötland near the arm of the Lake Sommen called Asbyfjärden. According to Svenskt ortnamnslexikon the name of the locality is first attested in 1336 as Aasby, in reference to the drumlin-like ridge (Swedish: ås) the locality is built on.

Sweden's stoutest spruce grows in Asby.

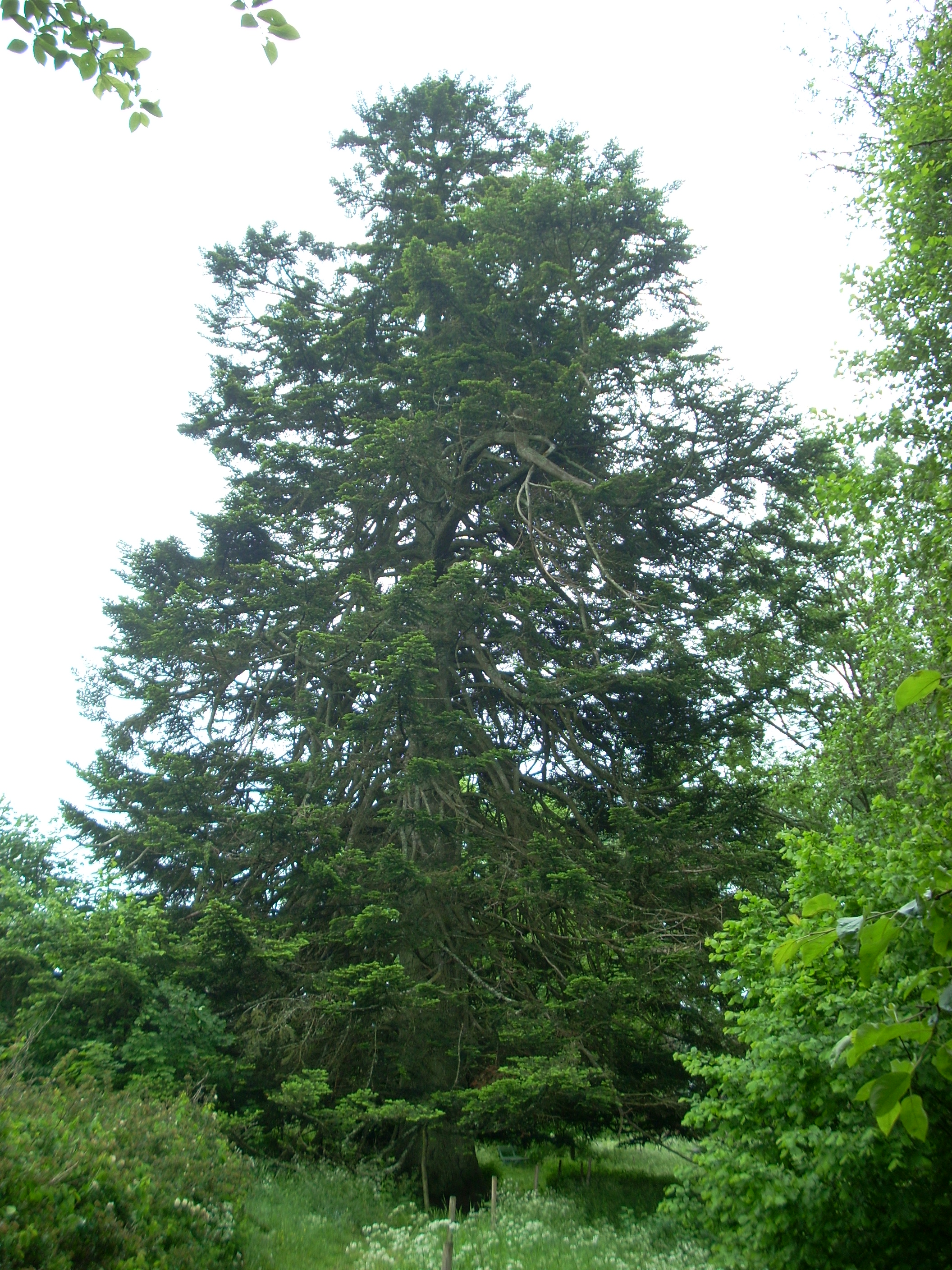
View of Asby spruce from afar.

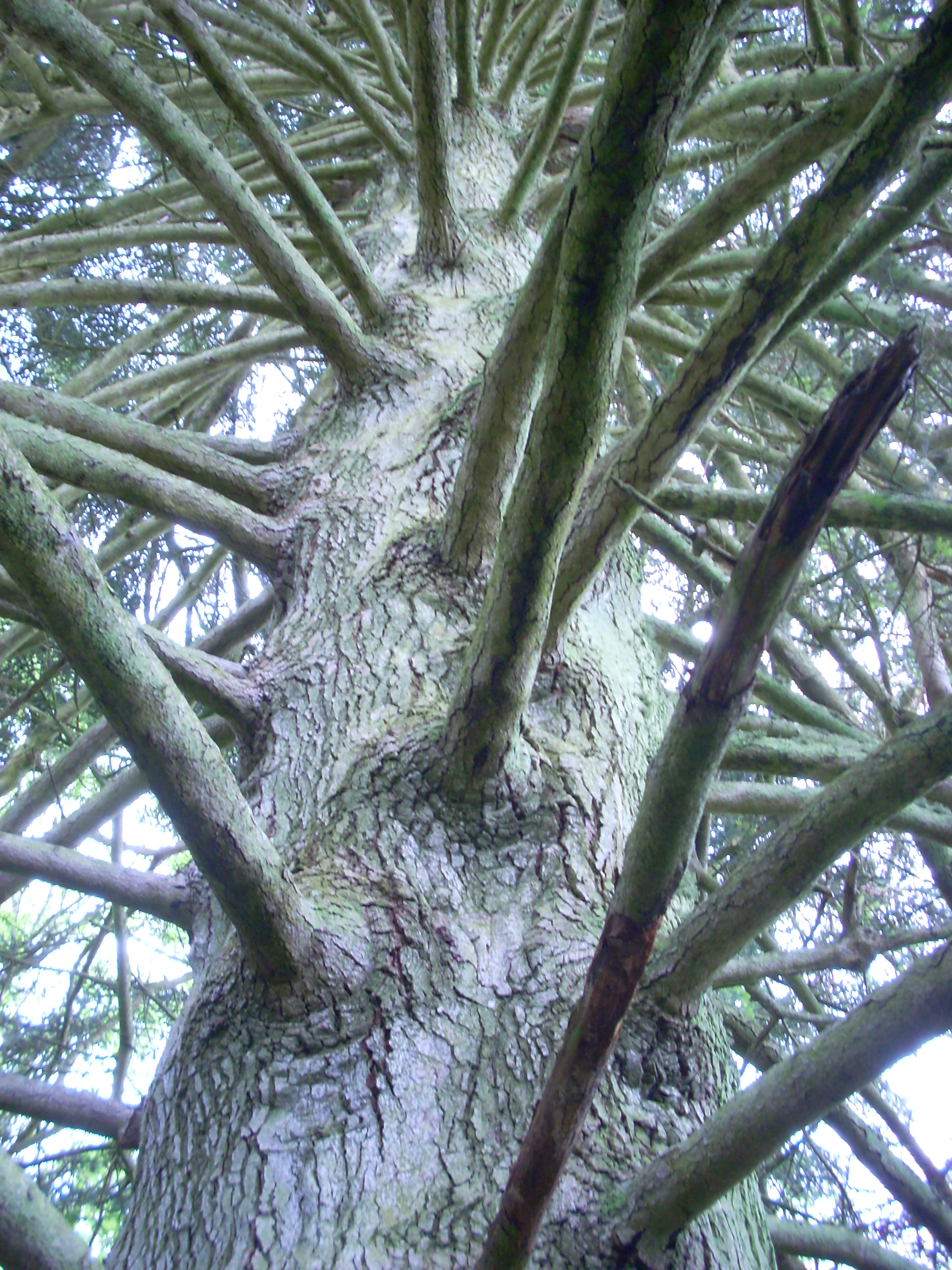
View of Asby spruce from below.
