= Vimmerby Municipality =

Vimmerby Municipality Vimmerby kommun
- Municipality
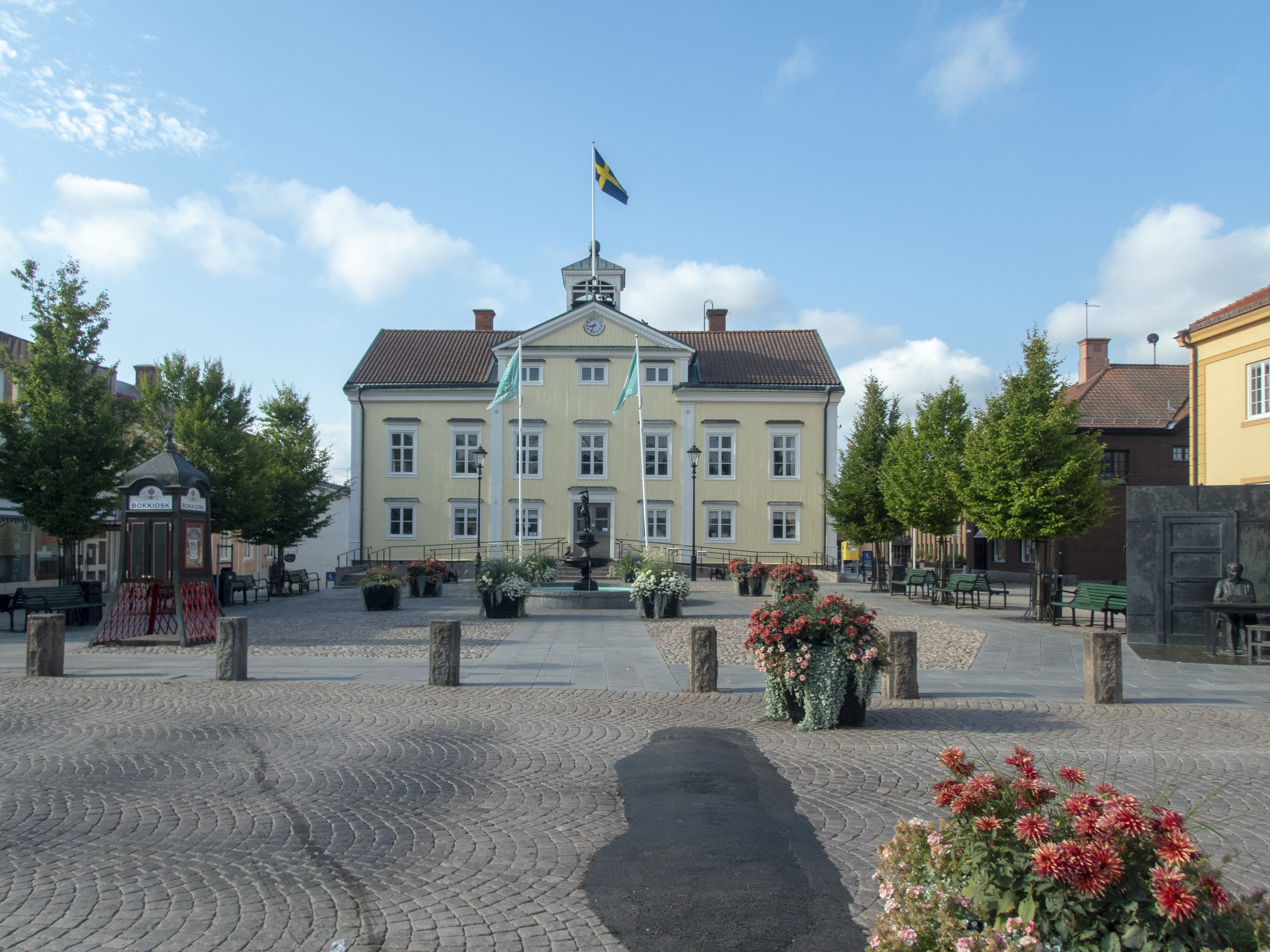
- Vimmerby City Hall

- Coat of arms

- Coordinates: 57°40′N 15°51′E
- Country: Sweden
- County: Kalmar County
- Seat: Vimmerby

Area
  - Total: 1,219.8 km^{2} (471.0 sq mi)
  - Land: 1,140.23 km^{2} (440.25 sq mi)
  - Water: 79.57 km^{2} (30.72 sq mi)
- Area as of 1 January 2014.

Population (30 June 2025)
  - Total: 15,414
  - Density: 13.518/km^{2} (35.012/sq mi)
- Time zone: UTC+1 (CET)
  - Summer (DST): UTC+2 (CEST)
- ISO 3166 code: SE
- Province: Småland
- Municipal code: 0884
- Website: www.vimmerby.se

Vimmerby Municipality (Swedish: Vimmerby kommun) is a municipality in Kalmar County, south-eastern Sweden. Its seat is located in the city of Vimmerby.

Stångån is a small river running through the municipality.

The municipality was created by the local government reform of 1971, when the City of Vimmerby was amalgamated with the surrounding rural municipalities to form an entity of unitary type.

== Localities ==
There are 6 urban areas (also called a Tätort or locality) in Vimmerby Municipality.

In the table the localities are listed according to the size of the population as of December 31, 2005. The municipal seat is in bold characters.

#	Locality	Population
1	**Vimmerby**	7,827
2	Södra Vi	1,197
3	Storebro	977
4	Gullringen	560
5	Frödinge	364
6	Tuna	249

== Demographics ==
This is a demographic table based on Vimmerby Municipality's electoral districts in the 2022 Swedish general election sourced from SVT's election platform, in turn taken from SCB official statistics.

In total there were 15,555 residents, including 12,022 Swedish citizens of voting age. 46.1% voted for the left coalition and 52.2% for the right coalition. Indicators are in percentage points except population totals and income.

Location	Residents	Citizen adults	Left vote	Right vote	Employed	Swedish parents	Foreign heritage	Income SEK	Degree
Location			%	%					
Djursdala	406	315	33.3	65.0	90	95	5	24,225	31
Frödinge	991	799	44.5	53.9	86	97	3	25,859	30
Gullringen	749	597	43.6	54.5	86	88	12	24,094	23
Locknevi	461	360	36.6	60.9	83	89	11	21,999	29
Rumskulla	730	527	40.4	58.9	86	86	14	24,023	30
Storebro	1,172	894	42.5	56.3	80	82	18	22,205	24
Stora Vi	1,541	1,194	46.9	51.2	84	89	11	25,198	22
Tuna	673	531	47.7	50.8	85	90	10	22,987	26
Vimmerby 1	1,772	1,483	45.7	52.9	84	87	13	25,550	29
Vimmerby 2	1,922	1,325	54.6	42.7	70	63	37	20,657	26
Vimmerby 3	1,886	1,449	45.5	53.6	87	90	10	25,702	35
Vimmerby 4	1,640	1,272	48.6	48.6	78	71	29	23,538	25
Vimmerby 5	1,612	1,276	46.8	52.3	92	92	8	29,600	32
Source: SVT

== Sister cities ==
Sister cities are cities or towns related to one another in size and history.

- Fargo, North Dakota, U.S.
- Moorhead, Minnesota, U.S.
- Skærbæk, Denmark
- Kauhava, Finland
- Þorlákshöfn, Iceland
- Rygge, Norway
- Joniškis, Lithuania
