= Södra Vi =

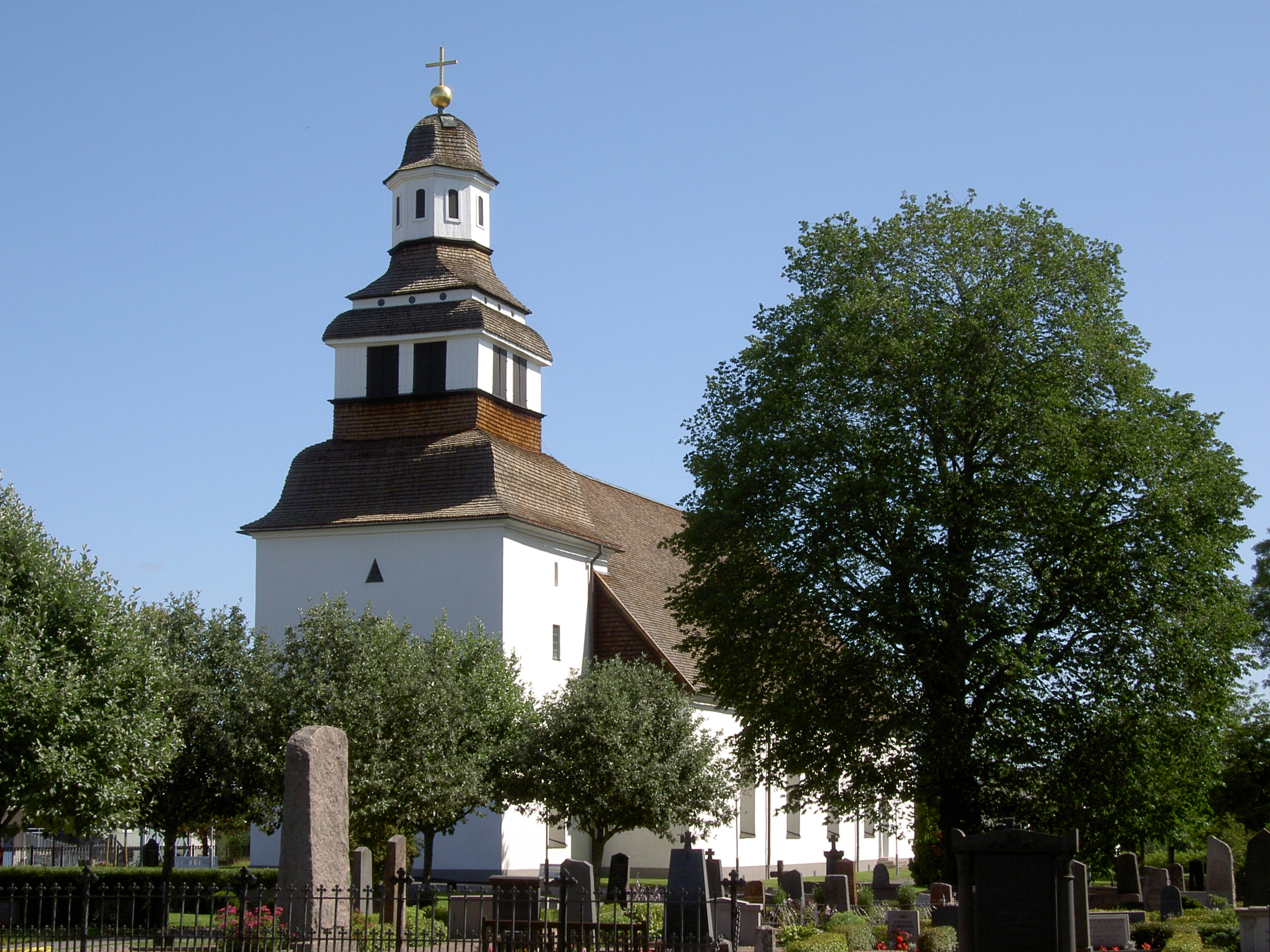

- Location within Kalmar Location within Sweden
- Coordinates: 57°45′N 15°48′E
- Country: Sweden
- Province: Småland
- County: Kalmar County
- Municipality: Vimmerby Municipality

Area
  - Total: 1.56 km^{2} (0.60 sq mi)

Population (31 December 2010)
  - Total: 1,182
  - Density: 756/km^{2} (1,960/sq mi)
- Time zone: UTC+1 (CET)
  - Summer (DST): UTC+2 (CEST)
- Climate: Cfb

Södra Vi is a locality situated in Vimmerby Municipality, Kalmar County, Sweden with 1,182 inhabitants in 2010. According to Svenskt ortnamnslexikon the name of the locality loosely mean "southern place of worship". Tens of kilometers to the northwest lies Norra Vi.
