= Frödinge =

- Location within Kalmar Location within Sweden
- Coordinates: 57°42′N 16°00′E
- Country: Sweden
- Province: Småland
- County: Kalmar County
- Municipality: Vimmerby Municipality

Area
  - Total: 0.85 km^{2} (0.33 sq mi)

Population (31 December 2010)
  - Total: 383
  - Density: 451/km^{2} (1,170/sq mi)
- Time zone: UTC+1 (CET)
  - Summer (DST): UTC+2 (CEST)
- Climate: Cfb

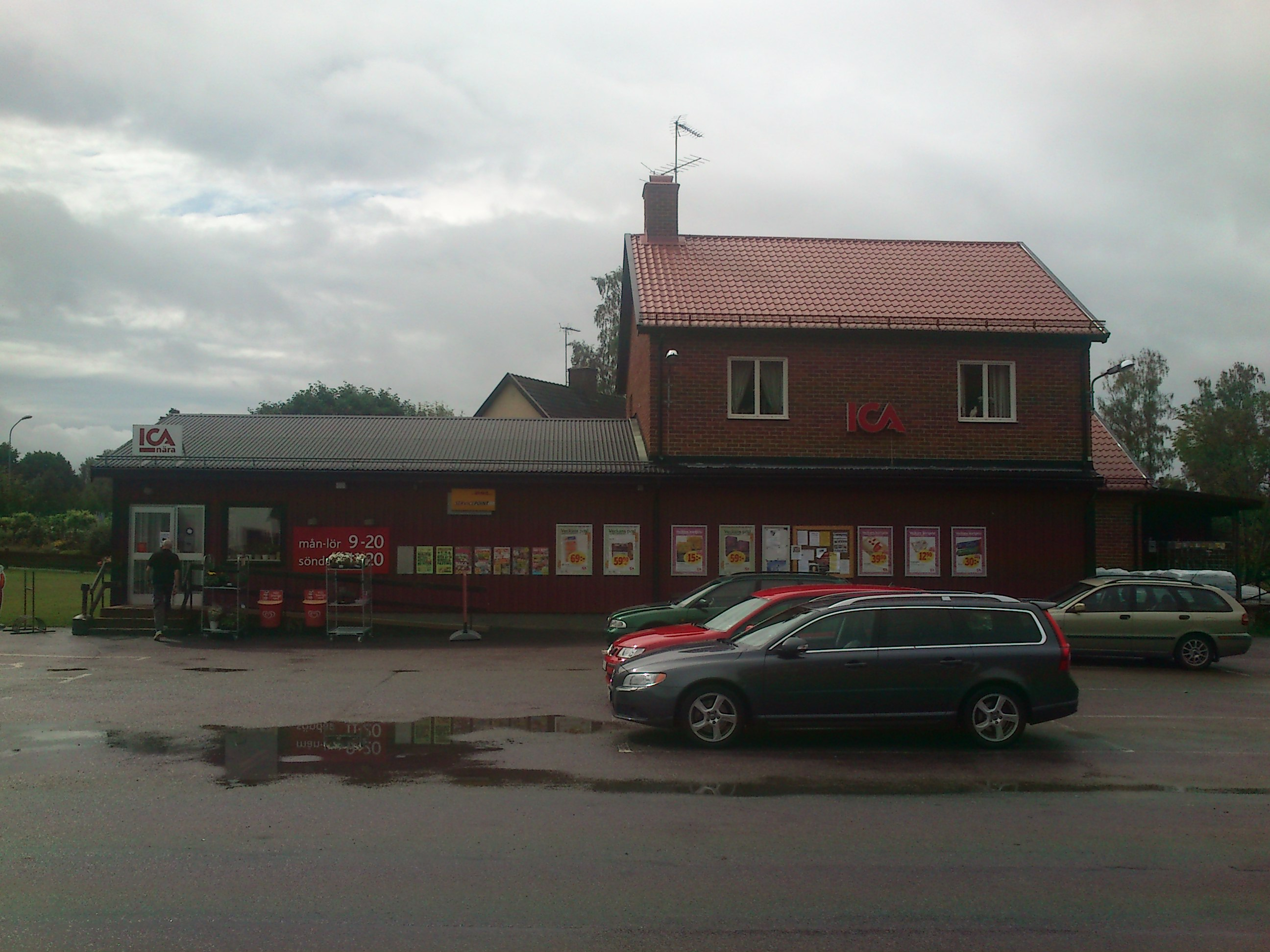
The ICA grocery store in Frödinge outside Vimmerby

Frödinge is a locality situated in Vimmerby Municipality, Kalmar County, Sweden with 383 inhabitants in 2010. In 2023, the population was down to 302.

The locality is perhaps mostly known for Frödinge Mejeri AB, a local dairy factory, which makes ostkaka (not to be confused with cheesecake), tortes and dessert pies.
