= Little Asby =

Village in Cumbria, England

Coordinates: 54.481°N 2.467°W

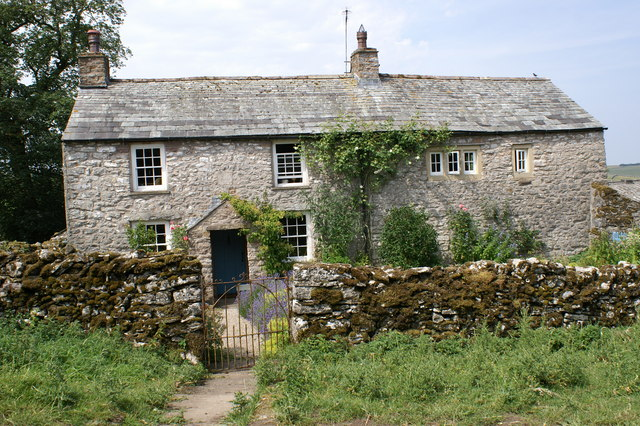
- Cottage, Little Asby

- Location in former Eden District, Cumbria Location within Cumbria
- OS grid reference: NY697097
- Civil parish: Asby
- Unitary authority: Westmorland and Furness
- Ceremonial county: Cumbria
- Region: North West
- Country: England
- Sovereign state: United Kingdom
- Post town: APPLEBY-IN-WESTMORLAND
- Postcode district: CA16
- Dialling code: 015396
- Police: Cumbria
- Fire: Cumbria
- Ambulance: North West
- UK Parliament: Westmorland and Lonsdale

Little Asby is a small village or hamlet in Cumbria, England. Historically part of Westmorland (now Westmorland and Furness), its name is said to be derived from the Norse words askr, meaning "ash", and by, meaning "farm". A chapel (St Leonard's Chapel), of which little remains, lay at the centre of the hamlet. Foundation mounds which remain on the site indicate that the chapel was a rectangular building about 41 ft. by 21 ft. in size.

Just outside the village, to the west, is Little Asby Common, which is a Site of Special Scientific Interest and a Special Area of Conservation because of the plant species that inhabit the limestone pavement areas, as well as the limestone geology of the area. In chronostratigraphy, the British sub-stage of the Carboniferous period, the 'Asbian' derives its name from Little Asby Scar.

== See also ==
- Listed buildings in Asby, Westmorland and Furness
