= Svinhult =

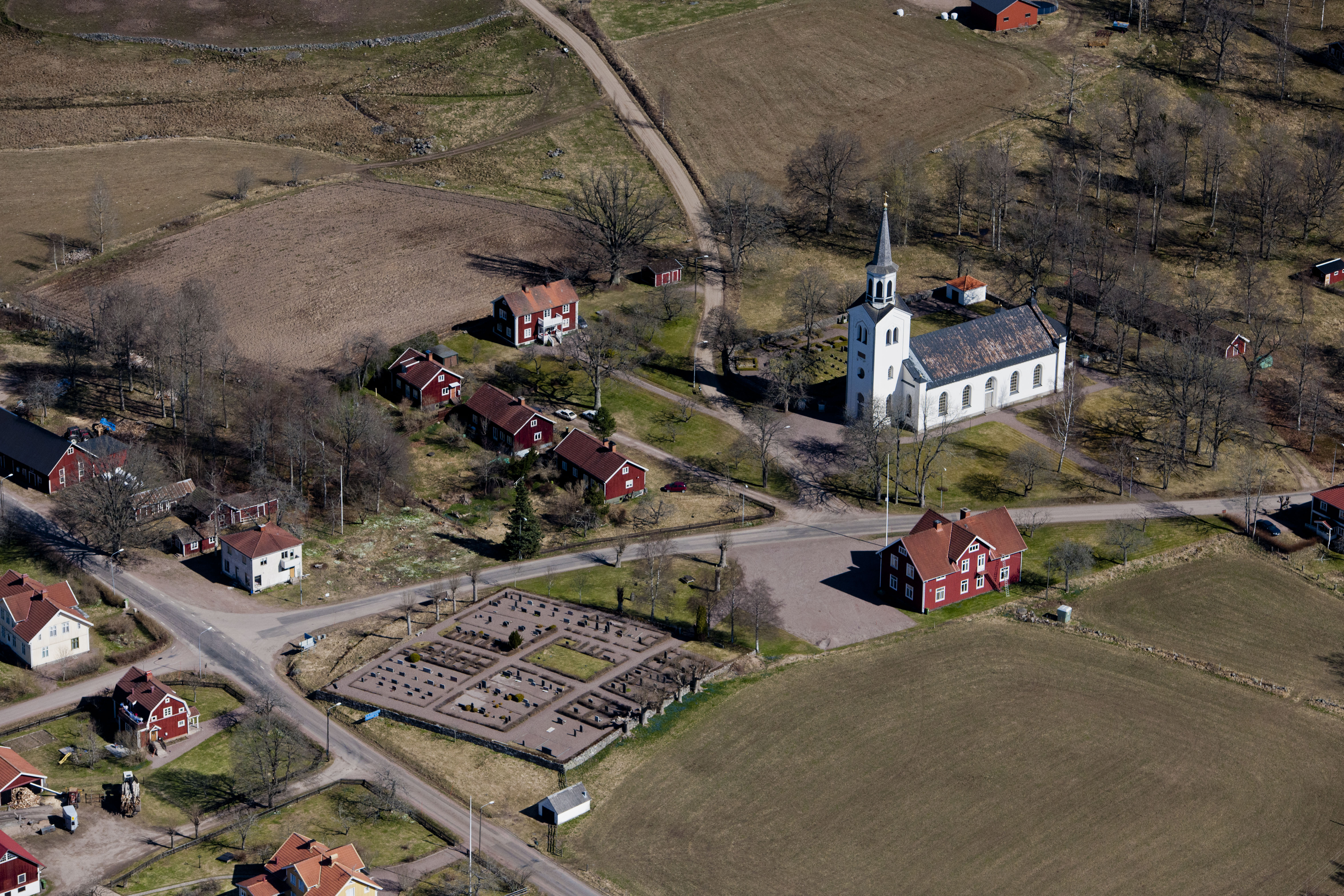
- Aerial view of Svinhult

- Location within Östergötland Location within Sweden
- Coordinates: 57.753611°N 15.379722°E
- Country: Sweden
- Municipality: Småland, Östergötland
- Time zone: UTC+1 (CET)
  - Summer (DST): UTC+2 (CEST)

Svinhult is a village in Ydre in the South Swedish highlands near the border between Småland and Östergötland. According to Svenskt ortnamnslexikon the name of the locality means "place of wildboars", while local scholar Robert Norrby traces it to "svidhja" meaning slash-and-burn which as a common agricultural practice in the past. Compared to other places of Ydre, Svinhult is more inhospitable. The vegetation around Svinhult is made up by pines and spruces while broad-leaf forests patches are few.
