= Niklas Lindgren =

Swedish serial rapist

- Born: Kurt Niklas Lindgren; 26 June 1972 (age 54); Umeå, Sweden
- Other name: Hagamannen
- Status: Released (2015-07-28)
- Convictions: Nine counts of sexual assault, two counts of attempted murder
- Penalty: 14 years imprisonment

Kurt Niklas Lindgren (born 26 June 1972, in Sörmjöle, Umeå Municipality), known in the media prior to his arrest as Hagamannen ("The Haga Man"), is a convicted Swedish serial rapist. Lindgren was convicted of nine counts of sexual assault in 2006, two of which were labeled attempted murder, in relation to attacks in the city of Umeå from 1998 to 2005. The attacks were all made outdoors, involved physical violence and in some cases attempts to kill his victims. The nickname "Hagamannen" refers to the area in Umeå named Haga where Lindgren made his first assault.

Lindgren was identified and arrested by the Swedish police after they received a tip from the public on 29 March 2006. His DNA matched the DNA previously secured from the victims. On 22 April Lindgren confessed to six of the assaults. On 19 July he was convicted of eight assaults by the Umeå District Court and sentenced to 14 years in prison. Lindgren appealed to the Upper Norrland Court of Appeal, which on 2 October upheld the district court's sentence plus one case of rape in 2000. Lindgren's appeal to the Supreme Court was not granted.

Lindgren was released on 28 July 2015 and is now on probation after nine years served.

On 22 August 2015 he was hit in the head with a golf club. On 13 November 2015, the three suspected attackers were found not guilty of Lindgren's assault.

== Partial list of attacks ==
- August 1998: a 14-year-old girl is assaulted.
- 1:20 a.m, 9 May 1999: a 26-year-old woman is assaulted and raped in a park in Haga.
- 6 November 1999: three women are assaulted in three different locations in Haga. One of the women is raped.
- 19 March 2000: a 22-year-old woman is assaulted on Brandmannagatan.
- 19 March 2000: a 22-year-old woman is assaulted and raped in the university area. The woman almost died from her injuries and hypothermia.
- 1 December 2000: a 15-year-old girl is assaulted and raped in Ersboda.
- Between 1 and 2 a.m, 10 December 2005: A 51-year-old woman is brutally assaulted and raped at Tegsbron. The woman was seriously injured and fought for her life while her assailant attempted to drag her to the edge of the ice covering the banks of the Ume river and throw her into the icy waters. The perpetrator bit her ear off during the assault, but police were able to locate it by using police dogs, and it was reattached at the university hospital.
- 13–15 December 2005: Two more women are assaulted, one at Tegsbron and another at the Mimerskolan. It is still not certain that the perpetrator in these cases was Hagamannen.

== Police investigation ==
The investigation to find Hagamannen was one of the largest ever in Sweden. More than 30 policemen worked full-time to catch the serial rapist, but the investigation met some setbacks. For example:

- The police received a tip from a woman at the university hospital in the year 2000 that a father of a newborn child bore a striking resemblance to the facial composite, but the police dismissed this tip. According to the woman she was told that it was unlikely that the father of a newborn child would be the perpetrator of such crimes. The suspect now in custody was at the university hospital at the time with a newborn child, and several assaults took place within the vicinity of the hospital at the time. The police are holding an internal investigation into why the tip was not taken more seriously.
- With the knowledge that the perpetrator had unusually small feet, the Swedish police attempted to access armed forces records. All Swedish men are required to register with the armed forces, who in turn determine their suitability for military service. During this selection a physical examination is performed and records are kept in case the need arises for further conscripts. The armed forces refused to hand over their records or allow access.
- DNA samples are taken from all children in Sweden in order to be used for medical research into hereditary illnesses at the PKU lab (the lab gets its name from Phenylketonuria). The police wanted to access this database in order to yield a suspect, but the lab refused. Some individuals have requested that their samples be destroyed; the police requested records of destroyed samples, but the lab refused.
- The suspect was found by forcefully mass DNA testing males in the area. A matching profile was found after 777 tests.

- The police then considered using a plainclothes female police officer in order to draw the perpetrator out, but this idea was discarded since such behaviour on the part of the police would constitute entrapment ("brottsprovokation") which is not allowed under Swedish law, according to JO (Ombudsmen of Justice, elected by the Swedish Government to ensure that the Swedish Government and its employees are following Swedish law.)
- Before taking him into custody the police spent some time observing the suspect's daily routine. The suspect apparently liked to spend a lot of time alone in the garage that he built adjacent to his house. The locations that the police mapped out served as a basis for the police interrogation and are therefore likely to be thoroughly examined by police forensic technicians.
- The facial composite has been a central point of the investigation, and its release to the media and general public ultimately proved to be what would yield the first suspect in the case. The police are also examining one unsolved murder and one death which took place under mysterious circumstances during the time that the Hagamannen was active. The DNA match will likely be the key evidence in tying the suspect to the crimes at trial.

=== Evidence ===
According to media reports, there are several facts in the case which indicate that the man which the police had in custody was the perpetrator:

- DNA: The Swedish Police and Swedish State Criminalistics Lab secured DNA samples from at least three of the crime scenes. The DNA from the crime scene near the Ume River (where the 51 year old victim was assaulted) matched the suspect's DNA. According to the criminalistics lab the probability of error is one in one million samples, which they characterize as a nine on a scale from one to nine.
- Facial composite: The suspect bears a striking resemblance to the facial composite- indeed he even jokingly referred to himself as Hagamannen when talking to his co-workers .
- Height: The perpetrator is unusually short for a man. The suspect is also unusually short for a man.
- Shoe size: The perpetrator has unusually small feet for a man, which the police have been able to determine by analyzing footprints left by the perpetrator. The suspect also has small feet, his co-workers even joked that he could be the perpetrator because of his unusually small feet.
- Proximity: The suspect works in a car-repair shop in the Haga part of Umeå, which is within the vicinity of many of the attacks. He had 24-hour access to his place of employment. The police theorize that the suspect may have used his place of employment as a base to look for potential victims.
- "Trophies": The police state that the perpetrator took "trophies" from at least three of his victims, such as identification documents. The police are searching premises that the perpetrator had access to in order to secure such trophies if they are in the possession of the perpetrator or in a location to which he had access. On 9 April 2006 the Police discovered a property located far from the suspect's residence and place of employment to which the suspect also had 24-hour access. The newly discovered property lies close to where some of the attacks took place.
- Line-up: In cases where the perpetrator did not leave any DNA evidence, or where the victim was able to escape, a police lineup can be used to identify the perpetrator.
- Knife: The police are also looking for a knife or knives used by the perpetrator in the property of the suspect, or in places to which he had access.
- Alibi and other circumstantial evidence.

=== Arrest ===
In response to a tip from the public regarding Lindgren's resemblance to the facial composite, the police approached him for a voluntary DNA sample. Lindgren refused, but was compelled to provide the sample in accordance with a new law after being interviewed by police.

On 29 March 2006, police learned that the DNA sample matched those taken from the crime scenes. Two plainclothes officers were sent to Lindgren's place of employment. They arrived during his lunch break; Lindgren failed to return to work after lunch. Later that afternoon police released a media report indicating that they had arrested a suspect in relation to the attacks.

=== Suspect in custody ===
Lingren was described in media reports as a 33-year-old man living just outside Umeå, a Swedish citizen with no criminal record who was now suspected by the police as the alleged perpetrator until January 2006. He worked at a Volkswagen car sales and repair shop as a sheet-metal worker, and was described as a normal family father with a common-law marriage and two children. He lived in Nyland, a small tight-knit community outside of Umeå.

== Court proceedings ==
Under Swedish law a suspect can only be held for a short period of time by the police before they have to be arraigned. On 31 March 2006 at 3 p.m. the suspect was arraigned before the Umeå Court. For security reasons the hearing took place in the secure courtroom. Much of the hearing took place behind closed doors, due to the nature of the crimes. A suspect can be held for an indefinite period of time prior to a trial, but the police and prosecutor have to show cause for this at arraignment hearings which have to be held at regular intervals. A suspect is allowed to request a defense attorney, Lindgren in this case requested Leif Silbersky, who was appointed as his public defender by the Umeå District Court.

Niklas Lingren was charged with four counts of assault, four counts of rape and two counts of attempted murder. At first he pleaded innocent to all charges against him. On April 22 he confessed that he attacked six women.

=== Prison ===
A person suspected of a serious offence and who is awaiting trial is normally held by the Swedish Prison and Probation Service. The suspect is normally not allowed any visitors or to communicate with the outside world, with the exception of his attorney, until the trial is concluded. The suspect is allowed to read books and magazines with the exception of material covering the case against the suspect. The reasoning for incarceration and isolation is that the suspect might resort to further crime, try to influence witnesses, alter his or her own statements or glean information useful for when he or she goes through a psychiatric evaluation.

== Media coverage ==
The case received extensive coverage in Swedish newspapers and on Swedish television. During the years 1998-2006 many people, mainly women in the city of Umeå, were afraid to walk alone at night.

=== Publication of name and picture ===
The Swedish newspaper Expressen published the name of the suspect together with his photograph shortly after his arrest by the police. A photograph of Lindgren was featured side-by-side with a composite sketch released by the police on the cover of the newspaper the day after his arrest.

The publication of the name and photograph of the suspect has been criticized by some since it can hamper the police investigation, reduce the evidentiary value of a police lineup for the cases where there is no other physical evidence and since it causes emotional suffering for the victims, the suspect's family and friends, and the suspect himself if he is later acquitted.

The editor of the newspaper defended the publication, stating that it could prompt other victims to report assaults, that the suspect was in custody, that there was a strong interest from the public who have a right to know (the purpose of the journalist), and that the evidence against the suspect in this case is especially damning.

When he became aware of the publication through his lawyer Leif Silbersky, Lindgren reported the publication to the Press Ombudsman, who can decide to bring the matter before the Swedish Press Council. The Swedish Press Countil will then offer an opinion on whether the publication was in line with good journalistic practice.

The publication of the name and photograph of the suspect in this case can be compared to the murder of Foreign Minister Anna Lindh in 2003 where the daily newspaper Dagens Nyheter choose to publish the name of the suspect (who was later convicted) while he was still at large. The publication at that time was justified by the newspaper since the killer was at large and that the police had already released a photograph to aid in his capture, a practice which was also done with the Malexander police killers Tony Olsson, Andreas Axelsson and Jackie Arklöv.

There is a difference in tradition between Sweden and other countries when it comes to the publication of a name and footage or photograph of a suspect. For instance, in the U.S. it is customary for the media to use the real name of a suspect, while in Sweden a suspect is usually referred to by their age (i.e. the 33-year-old in the present case) until a conviction has been secured.
