= Calle Jonsson =

Swedish citizen (born 1983)

Calle Jonsson (born 9 June 1983) is a Swedish citizen born in Långträsk, Piteå who was arrested in July 2001 on the Greek island of Kos, accused of attempted murder. His case is one of Sweden's most known and reported criminal cases in modern times.

== Detention and first trial ==
Jonsson was arrested on the island of Kos on 26 July 2001, accused of attacking Christoforos Serdaris—a waiter from Thessaloniki, Greece—while on holiday. Serdaris lost consciousness after he had been stabbed five times in the thigh, and three times in the chest and abdomen. Jonsson denied all charges against him from the time he was arrested. He was in custody until February 2002 when he was released on bail and returned to Sweden. In November 2003, a Swedish court ruled that he must return to Greece to face trial. Jonsson's family told the newspaper Aftonbladet that Serdaris had sought a payoff of kr 160,000, and began the legal proceedings when the family refused to pay. Jonsson decided not to attend the trial, as he said he did not trust the Greek justice system.

In the autumn 2004, Greece decided to have Jonsson extradited to the country via a European arrest warrant. The Swedish Supreme Court granted the request in November 2004. The request marked the first time Sweden was compelled to extradite a citizen under a 2004 law requiring European Union member states to trust each other's legal systems. An earlier extradition attempt had failed when Greece's parliament did not ratify the European arrest warrant legislation.

Jonsson was handed over to the Greek courts in January 2005 after he had appealed the ruling to all Swedish authorities. During the trial held on the isle of Rhodes, the prosecution described a fight between Jonsson and Serdaris. Serdaris claimed that Jonsson had attacked him. DNA evidence showed that Serdaris's blood was on the shirt Jonsson was wearing at the time of the alleged attack. Jonsson claimed that the Greek police had smeared his shirt with Serdaris's blood in an attempt to frame him. Greek police did not examine the crime scene. According to Jonsson's attorney, Leif Silbersky, the Greek police had placed Jonsson's clothes in the same drawer as Serdaris's clothes, causing DNA contamination. The clothing was held in Kos after the attack but was not analyzed before the trial; in fact, the clothes were not moved from Kos to the courtroom in Rhodes until the prosecutor requested an adjournment to have them brought in. Silbersky also pointed out that Serdaris did not identify Jonsson as his attacker at the time of the incident. When Serdaris was first shown Jonsson, Serdaris said that Jonsson could not be the person who attacked him.

Georgios Economou, the prosecutor, said that Jonsson was found lying under Sedaris, which could have indicated Jonsson stabbed him in self-defense, according to Economou. Economou also noted Jonsson's youth and lack of fluency in Greek. Accordingly, Economou recommended a mild sentence. Jonsson faced a maximum prison sentence of 20 years, which, per the terms of his extradition agreement, would have been served in a Swedish prison.

On 12 April 2005, the jury unanimously found Jonsson not guilty. He was released immediately. Serdaris's lawyer announced plans to appeal.

== Retrial ==
In November 2006, the Greek Court of Cassation ruled that Jonsson must be retried. The ruling stated, "We wonder how the t-shirt came into contact with the stabbed person's shoes and trousers." The Swedish Foreign Ministry described the court's order as "extremely surprising".

The trial was supposed to begin on 19 November 2007 but was postponed when Jonsson failed to appear. Jonsson's lawyer Silbersky had advised him not to attend; if he had appeared voluntarily and were found guilty, he would have served his sentence in a Greek jail. If the Greek authorities were forced to issue a European arrest warrant for him, he would have the option to serve his sentence in a Swedish prison. A strike by lawyers in Greece also contributed to the postponement.

In April 2009, Greek officials charged Jonsson and his parents with perjury, false statement, and aggravated defamation. Silbersky called the charges "absolutely ridiculous", saying that the case had become a matter of prestige for the Greek officials.

== Influence ==
Parallels to Jonsson's case were drawn with the case of "Swedish Anna", a Swedish woman vacationing in Greece who reported being raped to the Greek police. The case was closed before it went to trial, and Anna was prosecuted by the Greek justice system for defamation. The Jonsson and Anna cases lead to calls for Swedish vacationers to boycott Greece; experts predicted this call would have no impact on tourism.
