= Jackie Arklöv =

Swedish criminal (born 1973)

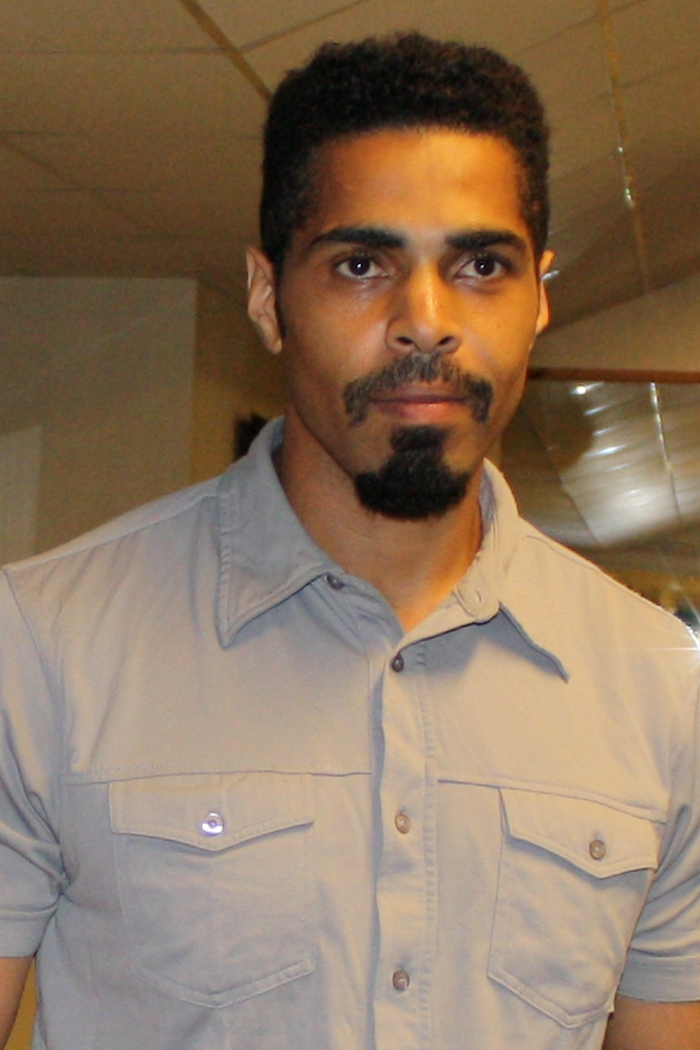
- Arklöv in 2009
- Born: 6 June 1973 (age 53); Liberia
- Occupations: Mercenary, criminal
- Status: Imprisoned at Anstalten Storboda
- Convictions: Crimes against humanity in Bosnia; 1999 murder of two police officers in Sweden
- Penalty: Life imprisonment

Details
- Killed: 2 confirmed

Jackie Banny Arklöv (born 6 June 1973) is a Liberian-born Swedish convicted murderer and bank robber. Arklöv is an ex-neo-Nazi, Yugoslav Wars mercenary and war criminal, who, with two other neo-Nazis, murdered two police officers after a bank robbery in 1999.

== Early life ==
Arklöv was born in Liberia; his mother was a Liberian woman and his father was European. He also briefly had a white American stepfather, who later rejected Arklöv's attempts to contact him. At the age of three he was initially adopted by a couple from Norway and later relocated with his family to Sweden at the age of seven and grew up in the Lapland village of Ankarsund. Arklöv was reportedly the only adopted child in the town and he has said that he had a hard time fitting in when growing up, and being both bullied and also bullying others. Arklöv told the police that he received corporal punishment, which has been illegal in Sweden since 1979, from his adoptive parents from grade 1 to 8. As a young boy he reportedly killed hens or chickens in the area.

Arklöv apparently had an identity crisis as a young boy and tried scrubbing his skin to make it white. As a child he also tried "colouring" his skin white at school by using flour. In his teens he developed a strong interest in Nazism and World War II. He has later said that he became a Nazi, among several reasons, because he "was lonely and full of hate" and "identified with those who were the losers" in the war, as he "felt as one" himself.

== Mercenary in Bosnia and warcrimes ==
Arklöv participated voluntarily in the war in Yugoslavia around 1992 from the age of 19 as a mercenary on the Croatian side. Arklöv was a convinced neo-Nazi at that time and he wanted to "experience war". As he read history he studied the fascist Ustasha/Independent State of Croatia and became fascinated by their reputation for extreme violence. At first he travelled from Sweden to join the French Foreign Legion but he heard that they were not participating in any wars, so he continued until he reached Yugoslavia where he joined the Special Purpose Unit "Ludvig Pavlović". He kept a war diary which has yet to be released to the public, but in which he wrote down his experiences. He participated in heavy and violent battles and committed crimes against civilians in villages. The unit were in many battles and heavy fighting over these years but not much has been documented about the group Arklöv was in. In one event between July 12-14 1993 it is documented that battles occurred against muslim troops and on July 14 Arklöv and his unit took the village Rotimlja and another village nearby, and multiple civilians, including children, were killed by the unit. Among the victims and families killed are two young siblings; 10 year old Adela Bucman, and 5 year old Adis Bucman. Arklöv's war diary on this date has a note saying that his unit "burn and eradicate the muslim village" and "throw grenades into homes and exterminate everything that lives".

Swedish journalist Magnus Sandelin wrote a book about Arklöv called Den svarte nazisten ("The Black Nazi") detailing his childhood and his time in the war. Sandelin is one of few journalists who has been able to study some material from the war diary Arklöv kept, and wrote that Arklöv had written that he participated in "cleaning up" towns and villages by throwing grenades into houses and then shooting those inside. He often listened to extreme metal while in combat zones or on these so-called missions. He also scribbled pages full of swastikas and wrote a short dictionary containing insults that he could say to his victims. He once sent a package home to his family during Christmas which contained the cap or hat of a killed soldier. Arklöv's mother said she felt disgusted when she opened it.

Arklöv once went back home to Sweden for a short break, and has admitted to have experienced psychosis-like hallucinations from the war then. It is documented that he once saw a black dog in his room at home while fully awake, and his family and friends which he slept at has stated that they heard that Arklöv had night terrors, but he still went back to Yugoslavia and to his unit and continued his life as a mercenary until the fighting ended.

After the events in Rotimlja he was stationed at the concentration camp Gabela and tortured prisoners again.

Arklöv was arrested in 1995, a short time after the fighting ceased, while walking over the Bosniak border while drunk and was accused of war crimes, including torturing pregnant Bosniak prisoners in concentration camps in Gabela camp, Dretelj camp and Grabovina. The crimes were severe and he had, among other things, forced a woman to say "Allahu akbar" before shoving his rifle into her mouth, whipped prisoners with a Waffen-SS belt, abused and tortured pregnant girls, as well as having beaten young men and broken their arms and legs. Prisoners in the camps called Arklöv "the Black Devil" because of his black fascist uniform and skin colour. When civilians were forced under torture to humiliate themselves by Arklöv but did not obey him, other guards would step in and tell the victims to "do as he says, or he'll kill you, he is totally insane" and laugh. Arklöv was seen talking to camp commander Bosko Previsić (known as "Boko") before and after tortures. In the Gabela camp he had, among other things, forced a man to crawl through a mine field, torn off sideburns on a man, forced one prisoner to stand on a murdered prisoner's body, and severely beat and abused prisoners. Some inmates in these camps were forced to hold their fingers apart or stick their tongues out while on the ground in a shed and then get hit with metal objects so hard that the skin between their fingers and their tongues would split. Arklöv wrote in his diary that joining the Croatian militia was a fulfillment to his "fascist dream" and that killing Muslims was "almost as good as an orgasm".

In 1995 he was sentenced to thirteen years in prison by a Bosnian court. The court later changed the sentence to eight years, taking his youth into consideration. He spent one year in a Bosnian prison, but returned to Sweden in July 1996 after an exchange of prisoners organized by the Swedish Red Cross. In Sweden he was taken into custody, but was acquitted and released in September the same year for lack of evidence, a decision that has been criticized afterwards since the Swedish prosecutor and investigators "didn't bother to look up or call a single witness or victim of his from the Bosnian court sentence". Arklöv received a sum of money from the Swedish state as "compensation for the 2 months he was in jail".

== After the war and Malexander murders ==
While in custody in Sweden, Arklöv received several letters from another neo-Nazi, Tony Olsson, who was starting a new militant neo-Nazi organization and, impressed by Arklöv's war experience, wanted him to join. Arklöv wrote back, and the two became friends. After being released in 1996, Arklöv and Olsson met with the other members of the newly started NRA (Nationalistiska Republikanska Armén or Nationella Republikanska Armén, "the Nationalist/National Republican Army"), among them Andreas Axelsson and Mats Nilsson.

His private life back in Sweden, after the war experiences, Arklöv described as a surreal nightmarish "twilight state" with feelings that his existence was "falling apart" and that he was living in a "world of ghosts, existing as a mere shadow, full of emptiness". He had hallucinations and strong symptoms of PTSD traumas. In the small town people also knew about Arklöv after the media had written about his mercenary life. He got into a fight at a local pub when one customer provokingly said "look at the mercenary there". At one pub, while drunk, Arklöv verbally threatened to hammer an AK47 bullet into the kneecap on a guest and to use barb wire around the neck on another guest. He was also arrested once for phoning in a bomb threat against a left-wing gig. A former girlfriend he stayed at for a short time said that Arklöv's life seemed ruined, he watched war movies on VHS for hours and could not sleep or live a normal functioning life, he also had episodes of rage and anxiety. Olsson has said at nights they could hear Arklöv waking up with a jolt from nightmares and having trouble sleeping. He started playing American Football and was good at it in his team but his PTSD and new contacts with criminal neo-Nazis started taking up more of his time. Among the neo-Nazis, it was mainly Olsson who wanted Arklöv in their group of friends, while many others thought it was "strange that a black, adopted man was hanging out with them".

The arrangement with the Nazis resulted in a robbery tour of the Swedish province of Östergötland in 1999, which ultimately ended on 28 May in Kisa where Arklöv, Axelsson and Olsson robbed Östgöta Enskilda Bank. Olsson waited outside the bank armed with an Uzi submachine gun while Arklöv and Axelsson went inside the bank, kicked open a door to the offices and cash registers and threatened the employees to open the vaults. As the vault was time-locked, the robbers were forced to wait 12 minutes before leaving the bank with a large sum of cash. They got away with over two million SEK, but during their escape a lone policeman, Kennet Eklund, followed them in his car. The robbers spotted him on the country road and in a curve on the road the robbers stepped out in a ambush-position and opened fire on Eklund's police car when it appeared. Two hand grenades were thrown in his direction and against his car. Both hand grenades exploded but Eklund got away without any injuries while the robbers continued their escape. Eklund told investigators he had hidden under a small boat in some reed on the roadside and had heard Arklöv's voice shout "the cop/pig is down in the reed" to his companions. After driving some 10 minutes, two policemen, Olle Borén and Robert Karlström, spotted the robbers' vehicle and drove after them in their own police car. There was some technical malfunction with the police radios in the countryside area which made Borén and Karlström not get the police dispatcher's full information on how extremely dangerous the robbers were. They followed the robbers' car as they noticed it was driving oddly and one of the robbers shot out the back window at the police car. More gunfire between the two policemen and the robbers occurred as both cars had stopped, and the two policemen were gunned down, and Arklöv rushed forward and executed both policemen at close range with their own guns. Arklöv has later stated that in the shootout he acted on instincts from his war experiences.

Arklöv and Olsson fled, but Axelsson had been hit by a bullet from one of the policemen and was taken to the hospital by a car flagged down by Arklöv. The men were quickly wanted and a nationwide manhunt began, and their identities posted in newspapers. Arklöv went to Stockholm and met two women in a shopping mall, who later witnessed that he behaved oddly and as if he was in shock. On 31 May 1999 Arklöv was shot by police in Tyresö, while walking outside one of the other two robbers apartment, and arrested and taken into custody.

== Trial ==
During the trial, Arklöv claimed to be completely innocent. He said he had been in Stockholm the entire time and did not take part in any of the robberies or the murders. But the evidence against him was strong. The police had found his fingerprints on a gun used during the crime, and his DNA on a mask and in the car. After that he confessed to the robbery in Kisa, but still denied having killed the policemen. The court could not prove who of the three robbers had fired the fatal shots, so they sentenced all three to life imprisonment for murder, since it was clear that all three had participated and had shot at the two policemen. The sentence was appealed to a court of appeal, and Arklöv kept denying he had anything to do with the murders. The court of appeal gave the same sentence; life imprisonment for all three. Arklöv later confessed to killing the policemen and to several war crimes in Bosnia.

== Yugoslavia war-crimes trials 2006 ==
In March 2004, the Dagens Nyheter journalist Maciej Zaremba published an article strongly criticizing the closure of the case about Arklöv's war crimes when he was returned to Sweden from Bosnia, and he also managed to find several witnesses and victims of Arklöv from when he guarded prisoners in Croatian concentration camps. Later that year the prosecutor decided to re-open the investigation, and in June 2006 it was clear that Arklöv would be prosecuted. The trial opened on 10 November 2006, several witnesses and victims of Arklöv's crimes were heard and interviewed. The judges made their ruling on 18 December 2006 and the court ruled that Arklöv was guilty of wrongful imprisonment, torture and assault of 11 Bosnian Muslim prisoners of war and civilians, ethnic cleansing, looting, and arbitrary detention of people; crimes protected by international law. He was ordered to pay between 70,000 kr and 425,000 kr (€7,700–€47,000; US$10,100–US$62,000) to 11 victims.

== In prison ==
On 8 June 2001, Arklöv confessed that he killed the two policemen in Malexander. Olsson and Axelsson moved a petition for a new trial to the Supreme Court of Sweden, but that court regarded the life sentence as written in such a way that Arklöv's confession would not change anything. The petition was rejected. At the same time Arklöv said he had abandoned his Nazi beliefs and had contacted the Exit group for support. Arklöv is serving his life sentence at the Kumla High Security Prison. He is an artist, and had seven paintings put out on an exhibition for prison art at Långholmen in Stockholm. His paintings often depicts historical battle scenes, nature landscapes, surrealism, caricatures and war memories.

In October 2010, Arklöv requested a time-limited imprisonment, but this was denied.

In May 2016, Arklöv was moved to the prison in Storboda because he had an inappropriate relationship with one of the guards at the last prison. In October 2016 Arklöv was assaulted by his fellow inmates in Storboda prison.

In June 2023, his sentence was commuted to 41 years, a decision that was appealed by the prosecution, and later overturned by Göta Court of Appeal. In April 2025, his request to be moved to a less secure prison were denied.
