= Malexander Church =

Coordinates: 58°01′56″N 15°16′40″E

- Malexanders kyrka
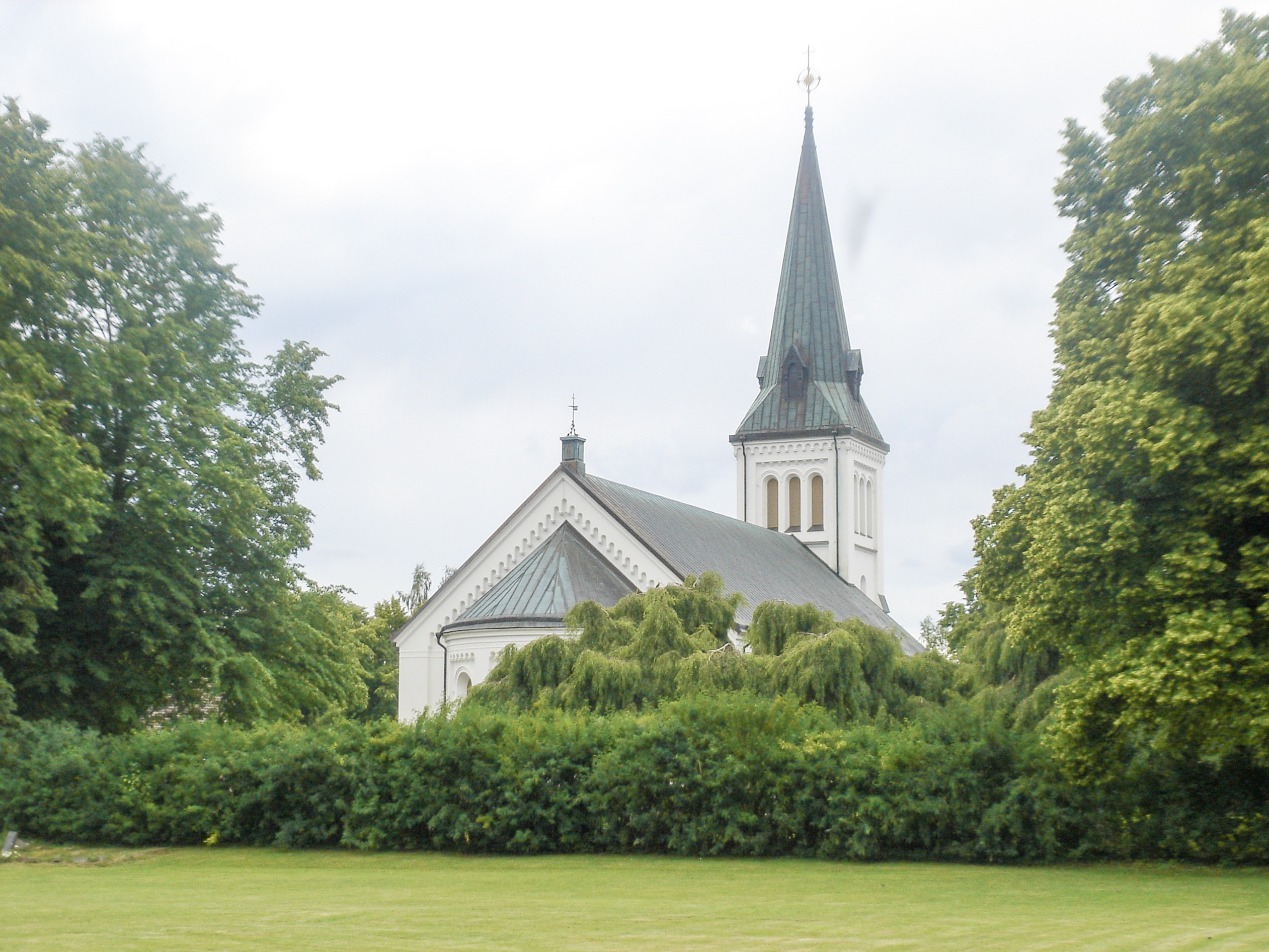
- Malexander Church
- Malexander Church
- Location: Malexander
- Country: Sweden
- Denomination: Church of Sweden

Administration
- Diocese: Linköping
- Parish: Boxholm

Malexander Church (Swedish: Malexanders kyrka) is a stone church, opened in 1881, located in the minor village Malexander in Boxholm Municipality, Sweden.

== History ==
There seems to be a church in Malexander already in the 13th Century. The 1st known information about a church is from 1345 when Bridget of Sweden's uncle Knut Jonsson, who owned the seat farm Aspenäs, willed money to the church and the priest Lambertus. This church, which was built of wood, burnt in 1587 and a new wood church was built. Perhaps the sacristy wasn't damaged in the fire.

In the 19th century there were so many people that the church was not enough. In 1877 they started building a new stone church exactly south of the wood church. In 1881 the stone church was finished and the next year the old wood church was demolished, but they photographed it before the demolition.

In 1929 the stone church burnt, but was rebuilt and opened in 1931.
