= Haga, Umeå =

Haga
- Residential area
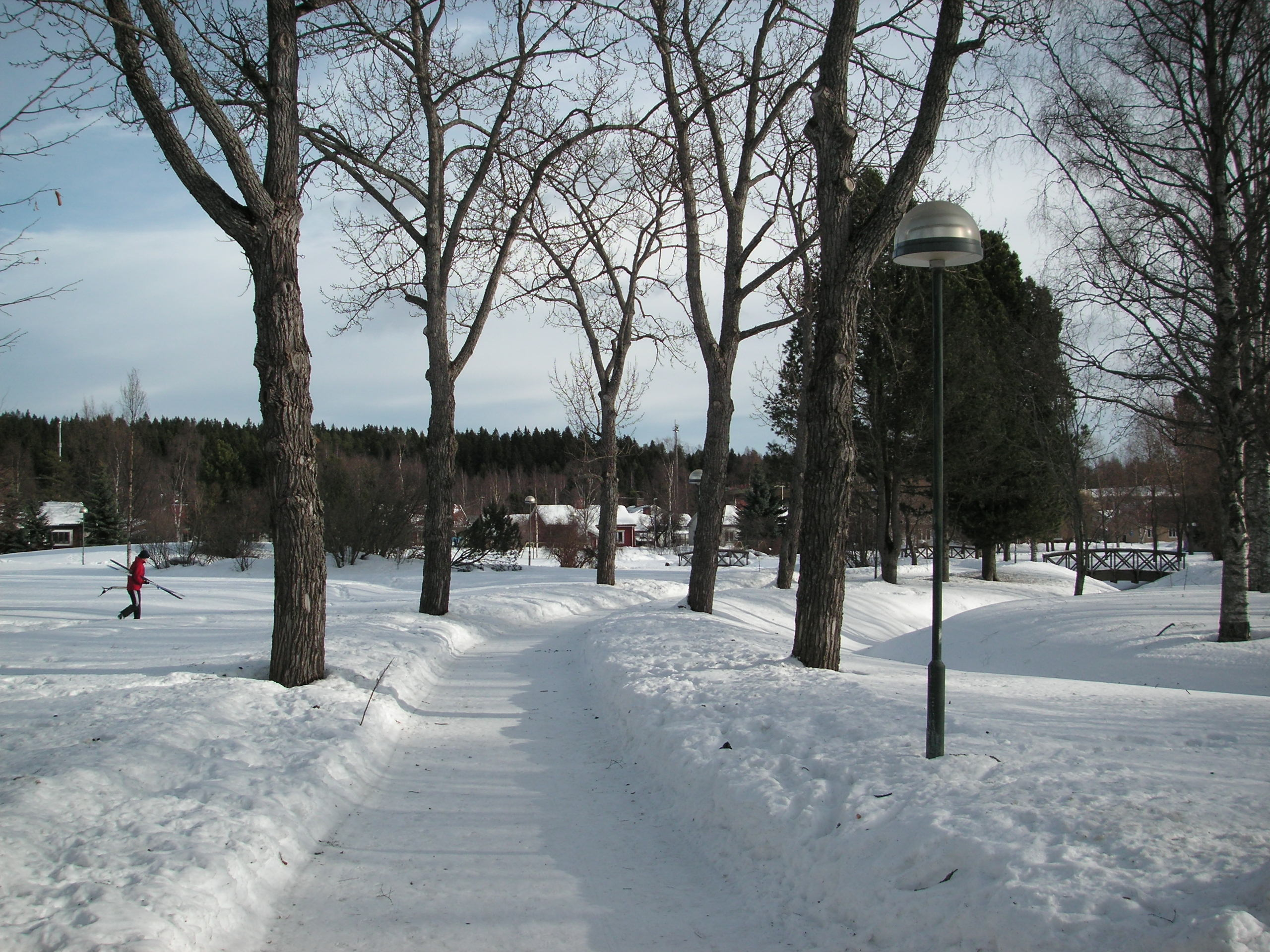
- Interactive map of Haga
- Coordinates: 63°49′55″N 20°16′30″E
- Country: Sweden
- Province: Västerbotten
- County: Västerbotten County
- Municipality: Umeå Municipality
- Time zone: UTC+1 (CET)
  - Summer (DST): UTC+2 (CEST)

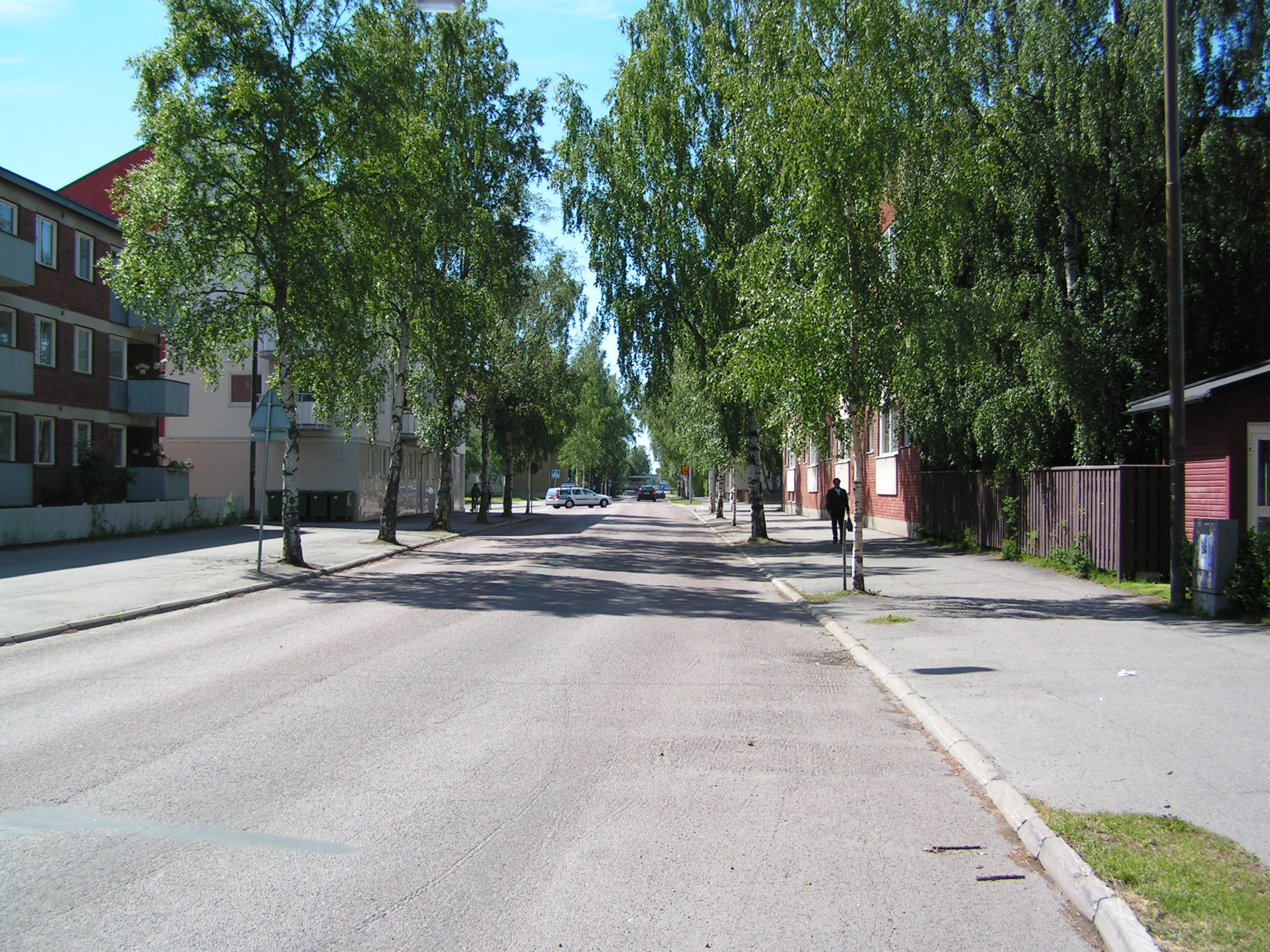
Östra kyrkogatan is one of Hagas main streets going through the district, from north to south.

Haga is a residential area in Umeå, Sweden, immediately north of the centre and the railroad passing Umeå.

== History ==
Haga is one of the oldest residential areas in Umeå, established in the late 19th century. From being an area sparsely populated by a few farmers, the relocation of the Västerbotten Regiment to Umeå (1893), and the first link to the national railroad network (1896), raised the need for central housing. Railroad workers and officers began to move into what then was perceived as Umeå's first suburb.

As Umeå has grown, the 21st century Haga is one of the most central districts, with a variety of (mostly small) villas, terraced houses, town houses, a few tower blocks, and several parks. Defined by a majority of buildings from the 1940s and 1950s, the district still has a small town aura, not so common in later built areas of Umeå.

=== Sports facilities ===
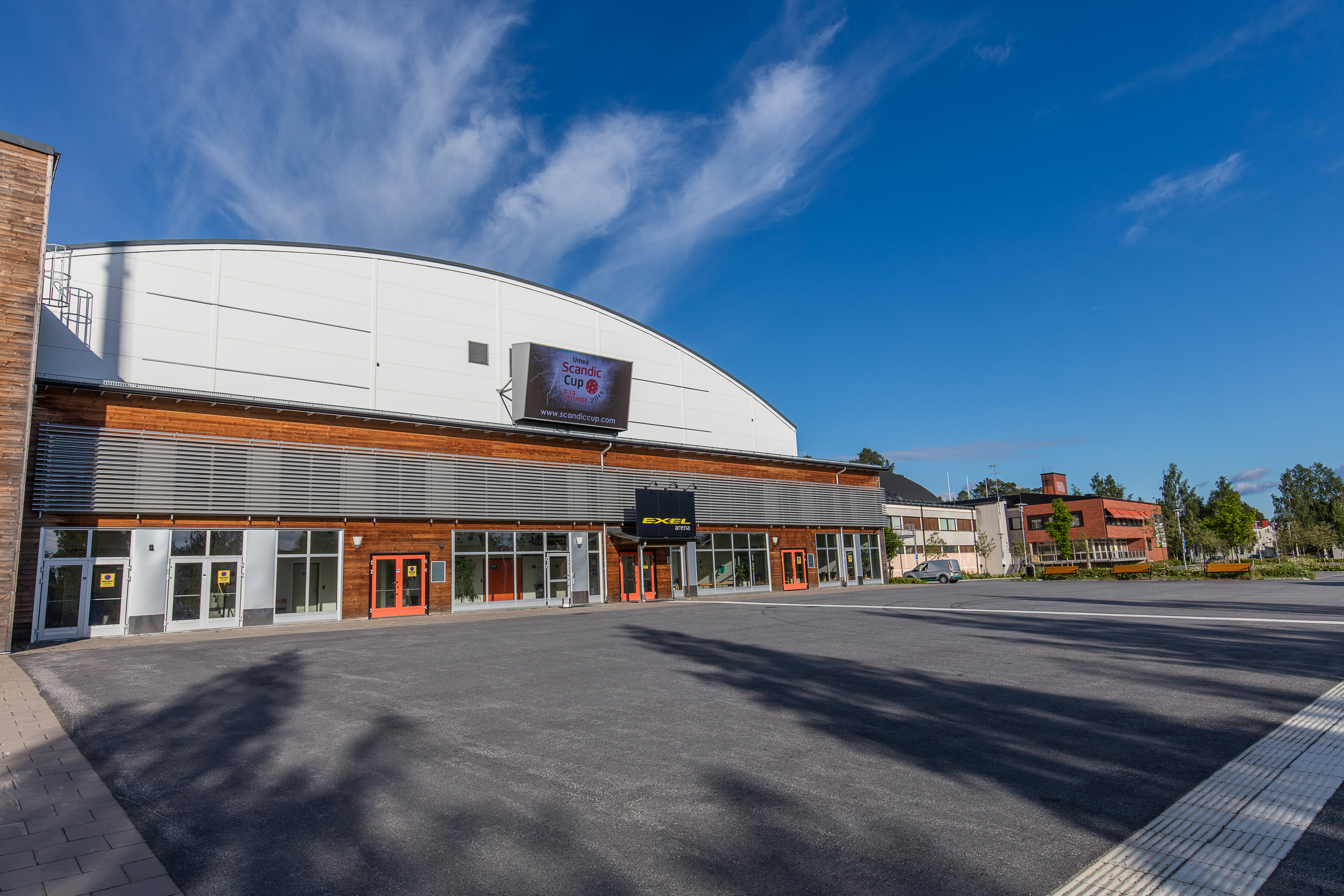
Umeå Energi Arena

The soccer stadium Gammliavallen built 1925 has since been rebuilt and is now accompanied by a pair of sport venues – for archery, basketball, combat sports, floorball, team handball, wrestling and more – and a public bath.

== Hagamannen ==
A series of assaults on women took place in Haga in the late 1990s. The perpetrator became known as Hagamannen.
