= Leif Silbersky =

Swedish lawyer (1938–2024)

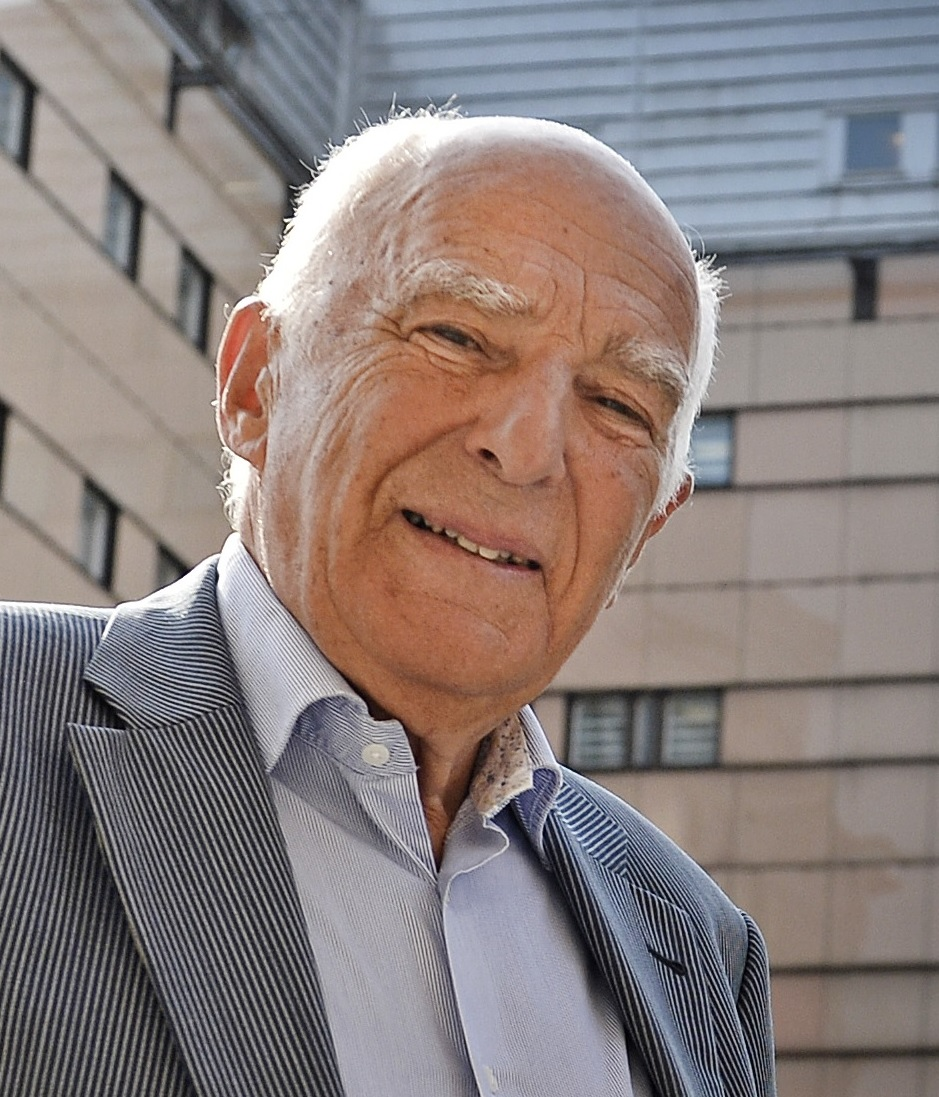
Leif Silbersky in 2015

Leif Silbersky (8 March 1938 – 20 December 2024) was a Swedish lawyer and author, living in Stockholm.

Silbersky was a prominent name in many high-profile cases which have attracted large media attention, making him one of the most notable and influential lawyers in Sweden.

Silbersky died on 20 December 2024, at the age of 86.

== Clients that were represented by Silbersky as reported in media ==
- Sigvard Marjasin, former county governor of Örebro (1996)
- Meysam Mohammadyeh, sentenced for participating in arson killing 63 people, Gothenburg discothèque fire (1999)
- Thomas Jisander, member of the board of directors in Trustor (2001)
- Daniel Wallén, "Järnrörs-Daniel" in the reality TV show Baren (2001)
- Marie Fredriksson, singer and songwriter. Member of pop group Roxette. She sued a newspaper for libel (2003).
- Calle Jonsson, a young Swede accused of having stabbed a man in Greece (2005)
- Anna Sjödin, former president of Swedish Social Democratic Youth League (2006)
- Niklas Lindgren, Hagamannen (2006)
- Janne Karlsson, coach for Linköping ice hockey (2007)
- Anders Eklund, found guilty of two murders, one of them a 10-year-old girl (2008)
- A murder of a 78-year-old woman, in connection with an argument about a parking spot (2010).
- Julian Assange, editor in chief of WikiLeaks, accused of rape and molestation (2010)

== Works ==
Aside from being a lawyer he also co-wrote many crime books with his friend Olov Svedelid including:

- Mord bäste broder (1974)
- Anbud från döden (1975)
- Döden skriver brev (1976)
- Sista vittnet (1977), also in English: The last witness.
- Straffspark (1978)
- Bländverk (1979)
- Målbrott (1980)
- Dödens barn (1981)
- Dina dagar är räknade (1982)
- Ont blod (1983)
- Villfarelsen (1984)
- Villebrådet (1985)
- Bilden av ett mord (1986)
- Narrspel (1988)
- Sprängstoff (1989)
- En röst för döden (1990)
- Döden tar inga mutor (1992)
- Och tiden den stod stilla (1992)
- Svart är dödens färg (1993)
- Skrivet i blod (1994)
- Den stora tystnaden (1995)
- Gå i döden (1996)
- Mördaren har inga vänner (1998)
- Den sista lögnen (2000)
- Upplösningen (2002)

=== Other works ===
- Att skiljas på svenska, (1966) (with Henning Sjöström)
- Älska i lagens namn: en debattbok om familjerättskommitténs förslag till äktenskapsrätt, (1967)
- Såra tukt och sedlighet: en debattbok om pornografin, Carlösten Nordmark, RFSU-debatt 1, (1969)
- Vad säger lagen om barnet? tillsammans med Karin von Schenck, (1969)
- Jag - en advokat, (1974)
- Det kunde gällt dig : vardagsfall från en advokatbyrå, (1975)
- Hundbiten; [teckningar och omslag av Ingrid af Sandeberg], (1975)
- Porträtt av terrorister: intervjuer med terrorister i israeliska fängelser, (1977)
- I skuggan av skampålen (1980)
- Att leva tillsammans med eller utan ring? (1986) (with Richard Schönmeyr, Sven Severin)
