= Facial composite =

Graphical representation of one or more eyewitnesses' memories of a face

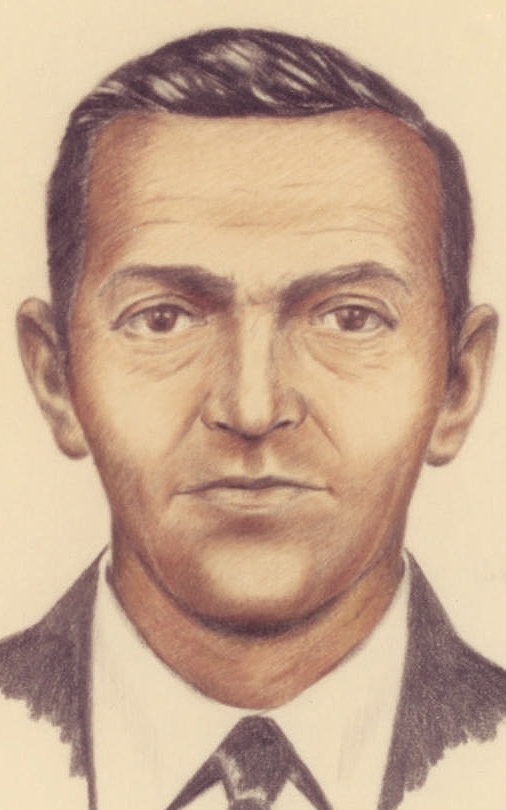
Composite sketch of D. B. Cooper (an alias), who hijacked an airplane in 1971

A facial composite, also known as a police sketch, is a graphical representation of one or more eyewitnesses' memories of a face, as recorded by a composite artist. Facial composites are used mainly by police in their investigation of (usually serious) crimes. These images are used to reconstruct the suspect's face in hope of identifying them. Facial reconstruction can also be used in archeological studies to get a visualization of ancient mummies or human remains.

== Methods ==
=== Hand-drawing ===
Construction of the composite was originally only performed by a trained artist, through drawing, sketching, or painting, in consultation with a witness or crime victim.

=== Feature-based selection ===
Feature-based systems essentially rely on the selection of individual features in isolation. Individual facial features (eyes, nose, mouth, eyebrows, etc.) are selected one at a time from a large database and then electronically 'overlaid' to make the composite image. This allows images to be created when suitable artistic talent is not available.

Such systems were originally mechanical, using drawings or photographs printed on transparent acetate sheets that could be superimposed on one another to produce the composite image. The first such system was the drawing-based "Identikit" which was introduced in the U.S. in 1959. A photograph-based system, "Photofit", was introduced in the UK in 1970 by Jacques Penry. Modern systems are software-based; common systems include SketchCop FACETTE Face Design System Software, Identi-Kit 2000, FACES, E-FIT and PortraitPad.

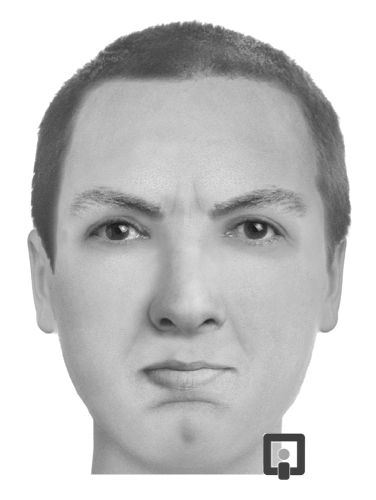
A facial composite produced by FACES software

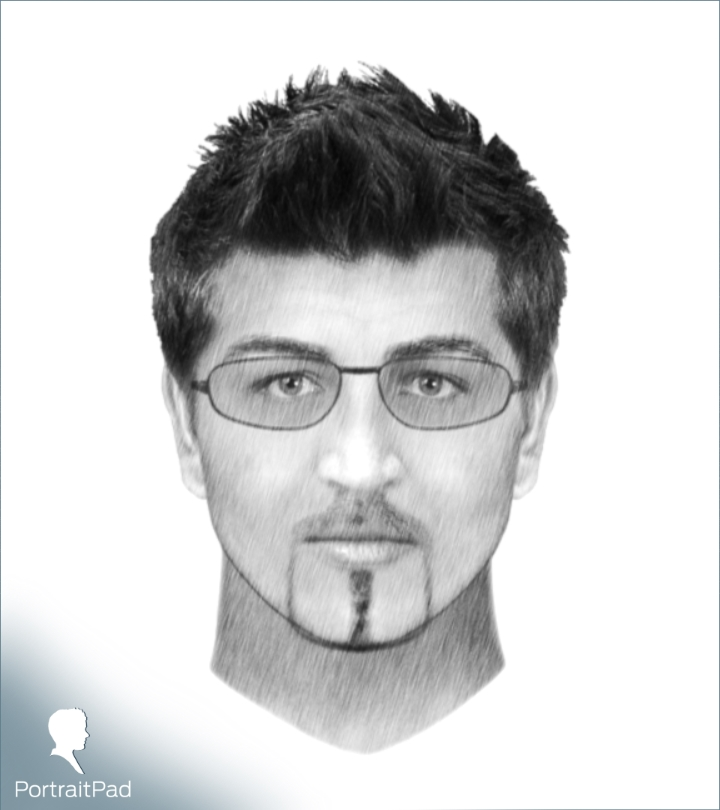
A facial composite produced by PortraitPad software

=== Evolutionary systems ===
Evolutionary systems may be broadly described as holistic or global in that they primarily attempt to create a likeness to the suspect through an evolutionary mechanism in which a witness's response to groups of complete faces (not just features) converges towards an increasingly accurate image. Introduced in the 2000s, such systems are finding increasing use by police forces.

Several of these systems originate in academia: EFIT-V (University of Kent), EvoFIT (University of Stirling, University of Lancashire, and University of Winchester), and ID (University of Cape Town).

A 2012 police field trial indicated that an EvoFIT directly led to the arrest of a suspect and then a conviction in 29% of cases. There have been many notable successes - for example, in this investigation, EvoFIT has directly led to the arrest of a serial rapist.

== Usage ==
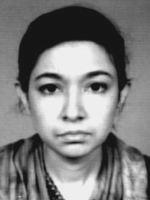
Facial composite of Aafia Siddiqui, created by the FBI for a wanted poster

While the classic use of the facial composite is the citizen recognizing the face as an acquaintance, there are other ways where a facial composite can prove useful. The facial composite can contribute in law enforcement in a number of ways:

1. Identifying the suspect in a wanted poster.
2. Additional evidence against a suspect.
3. Assisting investigation in checking leads.
4. Warning vulnerable population against serial offenders.

Facial composites of various types have been used extensively in television programs which aim to reconstruct major unsolved crimes with a view to gaining information from the members of the public, such as America's Most Wanted in the US and Crimewatch in the UK.

== Notable cases ==
These notable cases had facial composites assist in identifying the perpetrator:

- Rodney Alcala
- Daniel Lee Corwin
- Joseph James DeAngelo
- Timothy Hennis
- Derrick Todd Lee
- Manchester serial rapist Asim Javed.
- Niklas Lindgren
- Anatoly Maistruk
- Timothy McVeigh
- Christine Paolilla
- Reinaldo Rivera

== See also ==
- Police lineup

External image
- Forensic sketches of literary criminals. By Joshua Cohen & Barbara Anderson
