= Anatoly Maistruk =

Soviet serial killer

- Family photograph (circa 1980s)
- Born: Anatoly Grigoryevich Maistruk; 1948; Mykytyntsi, Khmelnytskyi Oblast, UkSSR, USSR
- Died: 1981 (aged 32–33); Irkutsk Oblast, RSFSR, USSR
- Cause of death: Suicide by hanging
- Convictions: Murder x8 Manslaughter (vehicle accident)
- Penalty: Death (murders); 4 years, reduced to 2 (vehicle accident)

Details
- Victims: 8–28
- Span of crimes: ?–1981
- Country: Soviet Union
- States: Irkutsk, Voronezh, others confessed
- Date apprehended: September 1981

Anatoly Grigoryevich Maistruk (Russian: Анатолий Григорьевич Майструк; 1948 – 1981) was a Soviet serial killer who murdered at least eight men of Central Asian descent in Irkutsk and Voronezh Oblasts in 1981, most of whom he beheaded. His motive was supposedly hatred since he had caught his girlfriend cheating on him with an Uzbekistani immigrant.

Although he initially confessed to 28 murders in total and was investigated for similar killings across the USSR, Maistruk was found guilty of his eight confirmed killings and sentenced to death. By the time the verdict was announced, however, he had hanged himself in the detention centre.

== Early life ==
Anatoly Grigoryevich Maistruk was born in the 1948 in the village of Mykytyntsi, Khmelnytskyi Oblast, UkSSR, the older of two sons born to Grigory and Anna Maistruk. Sometime during his youth, his father was imprisoned for collaborating with the Germans during World War II, due to which Maistruk and his younger brother Leonid were ostracized and bullied by their peers, who called them fascists. Due to this, Anatoly often had to defend his brother and engaged in fistfights, from which they developed a strong bond with one another.

In 1963, his mother was arrested for stealing food from her workplace and given an eight-year prison sentence. Fearing that both of them would be sent to an orphanage, Anatoly took his brother and fled the village, wandering around various parts of the USSR and surviving on odd jobs. When he came of age, Maistruk enlisted in the Soviet Armed Forces, where he received special training in knife throwing and Sambo. After leaving the military, he resumed travelling between various parts of the USSR with Leonid.

=== Automobile accident ===
In 1974, Maistruk was working as a truck driver, driving a Kamaz-brand delivery truck. One day, while passing through a village in Krasnodar Krai, he accidentally struck and killed a young boy who was playing on a road just outside of the settlement. Mortified by the accident, he picked up the boy's body and carried it back to the village. Villagers soon gathered to see what was going on, and after hearing from one of the boy's playmates that the stranger had killed him, some of the residents almost lynched Maistruk, but were prevented by members of the militsiya who had arrived at the scene.

Investigators soon established that the boy was struck while playing a game of courage with his friends and that his death was an accident. Maistruk was charged and convicted of vehicular manslaughter, for which he was ordered to serve a four-year sentence at a local detention centre. He was released two years early for good behaviour, and thereafter moved to Ust-Ilimsk, in the Irkutsk Oblast, where he found work at a construction site for a new hydroelectric power plant.

=== Speculation and cheating incident ===
Maistruk became a speculator; he would often sell cars such as Zhiguli and Moskvitch at a higher price, often bypassing Soviet regulation for purchasing automobiles. One report conducted after his arrest estimated that before the murders, he would buy a car for 7,000 rubles and later resell it for 14,000. Most of his customers were druzhinniks from the Central Asian part of the USSR, most often from states such as the Uzbek and Tajik SSR.

One day in early 1981, Maistruk and his girlfriend Anya had invited over a potential Uzbek client into their home for a cup of tea and some food. At one point, Maistruk left to buy some groceries, but when he returned, he found the Uzbek having sex with his girlfriend. Believing that she was being raped, he beat up the man and threw him out of his home. Unbeknownst to him, Anya frequently had short-term relationships with his customers, and likely pretended to be the victim of rape to avoid trouble. This incident caused Maistruk to develop a fierce hatred of Central Asians, as he believed that they were all manipulators and liars.

== Murders ==
Using his position in the car dealing business, he would often lure customers (usually in pairs of two or three) to isolated areas where he would then separate them and kill them one by one. This often involved either stabbing them with a knife or bludgeoning them with a hammer, with at least one victim being killed with the help of a throwing knife. Some of his known victims were decapitated while still alive, and all of them were left naked from the waist down.

=== Ust-Ilimsk triple murder ===
Sometime during the summer of 1981, Maistruk got into contact with three prospective customers – brothers Jalol and Euchritdin Muidinov and their uncle Rada – offering to sell them a car. The three were then lured to the outskirts of Ust-Ilimsk, and while they were admiring the beautiful view, Maistruk stabbed and bludgeoned them, beheading Jalol while he was still alive. After this, he dragged away their bodies to separate locations and abandoned them. A young couple who were searching for a place to make out would later accidentally find one of the bodies in an abandoned building, and after noticing a blood trail leading them further away into the forest, the dispatched officers found the remaining two.

Bloodied shirt belonging to one of the victims

While it was quickly established that the victims were likely Central Asians, judging by they had eaten pilaf shortly before their deaths, the coroners struggled to identify them. Investigators were dispatched to the Kazakh and later the Uzbek SSR to look for relatives – after some searching, investigator Rais Mazitov decided to buy some souvenirs in Tashkent, only to come across some clothing whose fabric was similar to that of the victims' clothing. He learned that it was produced in a single factory in Namangan, and when he went there to look for potential clues, Mazitov located an elderly veteran who claimed that the victims were his nephew and grandsons, and that they had gone to Irkutsk to buy a car with 14,000 rubles hidden in their shorts. According to the veteran, he had submitted a missing persons report for all three some time ago, but the local police department had ignored his pleas for help. When asked if he knew anybody who would want to harm his relatives, the veteran mentioned a man by the name of "Kambarov", but said that he wanted to kill him himself.

Fearing that the man could potentially kill an innocent victim, Mazitov tracked down and identified the man as Holbek Kambarov, a friend of the Muidinovs who had accompanied them at the deal. He was detained as a possible suspect, but during questioning, he claimed that he had nothing to do with the triple murder. When asked about the seller, Kambarov said that he did not remember his name, but remembered that the man was of Slavic appearance, blond, very tall and well-built, and owned a rare white Zhiguli.

=== Voronezh murders ===
While police in Irkutsk were still investigating the Muidinov murders, they soon received a tip about a similar crime that had occurred in rural Voronezh Oblast. On 2 September, a group of teenagers who had gone camping found the body of a man in a forest. Over the next several days, officers discovered two additional bodies, and upon investigating the crime scene, local authorities established their identities as three acquaintances from the Turkmen SSR: Allamurat Hudoyarov, Yakkbay Kerimov and Illan Uallyev. Hudoyarov and Kerimov had been repeatedly stabbed to death, while Uallyev, an army veteran, had been killed with a throwing knife.

A short time after this discovery, Voronezh investigators were informed of a double murder in a different jurisdiction that shared similarities with this crime. In that case, the victims were two male relatives, whose names and nationality have not been revealed, who had also been stabbed to death and had tried to buy a car. Due to the similarities shared with the murders in Irkutsk, investigators in both oblasts concluded that they had been committed by the same murderer.

=== Investigation and arrest ===
This facial composite eventually led to Maistruk's arrest

As the Voronezh killings occurred while he was still in prison, Holbek Kambarov was eventually released from custody and returned to Namangan. Using the description of the seller he had provided to authorities, a facial composite was developed and distributed to papers across the USSR.

A police officer from Ust-Ilimsk noticed that the facial composite drawing bore a striking resemblance to his friend, Anatoly Maistruk, but initially dismissed it as a funny coincidence. After learning about the drawing from the officer, Maistruk went into hiding. During this time, blood and hair analysis conducted on his car linked him to the crime scenes. After interviewing Maistruk's current girlfriend, they learned that he had a habit of immediately undressing, jumping into bed and fondling her breasts when he returned from work, which investigators decided to use as a trap.

Mazitov and two of his colleagues were tasked with arresting Maistruk, and to do so, they sent a fake telegram in Leonid's name, telling Anatoly that it's safe to come back. Mazitov dressed up as his girlfriend and lay in bed while the two other officers stayed on guard in the kitchen. After waiting for two days, Maistruk appeared and did his usual routine, but in the midst of his confusion, he was knocked out by the officers and detained.

== Interrogation, confessions, and suicide ==
During subsequent interrogations, Maistruk vehemently refused to cooperate and was overtly aggressive until he learned that his younger brother, Leonid, had also been arrested. Demanding that Leonid be released in exchange for his testimony, Anatoly admitted to the eight killings, but also hinted that his true number of victims was 28 in total; when he realized that the investigators were unaware of this, he refused to elaborate further.

Charged with the eight known murders, Maistruk was swiftly convicted and sentenced to death. When prison guards went to inform him of the verdict, however, they found that he had hanged himself. He had left behind a suicide note, saying that he would not allow them to shoot him. For his role in the car speculation business, Leonid Maistruk was convicted and sentenced to eight years imprisonment; after serving out his sentence at a colony in Ust-Kut, he is reported to have married, had children and lived an honest life until his death from an undisclosed illness.

As of January 2023, no further murders have been linked to Maistruk. His case received renewed interest after being declassified and shown on an episode of The investigation was conducted... in 2021. The following year, Mazitov was interviewed by Komsomolskaya Pravda about the Maistruk case, in which he revealed that they had investigated him for additional murders committed in Moscow, Anadyr, Bratsk and Voronezh, as well as the Uzbek, Kazakh, Ukrainian, Moldavian and Latvian SSRs.

== See also ==
- List of Russian serial killers
