= Östgöta Enskilda Bank =

Former bank in Sweden

Östgöta Enskilda Bank was a Swedish commercial bank. It was purchased by Danske Bank in 1997 and later converted into a branch.

== History ==
The bank was founded in 1837 as Öst-Götha-Bank in Linköping. The bishop Johan Jacob Hedrén was bank director. In 1846 it changed name to Östgötha Enskilda Bank and in 1856 to Östergötlands Enskilda Bank.

The bank in Kisa, Östergötland was robbed on 28 May 1999 and with police in pursuit the robbers killed two policemen, see Malexander murders.

The banks in Stockholm and Östergötland County were called "Östgöta Enskilda Bank" until 2011, when they changed their name to "Danske Bank".

== Provincial banks ==
The banking license was held by Östgöta Enskilda Bank, but it used different brand names in various parts of the country, typically named after the historical Provinces or Counties of Sweden.

- Bohusbanken (in Bohuslän and Gothenburg)
- Gävleborgs Provinsbank (in Gävle)
- Hallands Provinsbank (in Halland)
- Närkes Provinsbank (in Närke)
- Skånes Provinsbank (in Skåne)
- Smålandsbanken (in Småland)
- Sundsvallsbanken (in Sundsvall)
- Sörmlands Provinsbank (in Södermanland)
- Upplandsbanken (in Uppland)
- Värmlands Provinsbank (in Värmland)
- Västmanlands Provinsbank (in Västmanland)
- Älvsborgs Provinsbank (in Älvsborg County)
- Östgöta Enskilda Bank (in Östergötland and Stockholm)

== Sources ==
- Official website
- Östgöta Enskilda Bank byter namn (the change of name from Östgöta Enskilda Bank to Danske Bank)
- OAB logos - a web page showing the logos of OAB.
