= Långträsk =

Village in Piteå Municipality, Sweden

Coordinates: 65.383°N 20.332°E

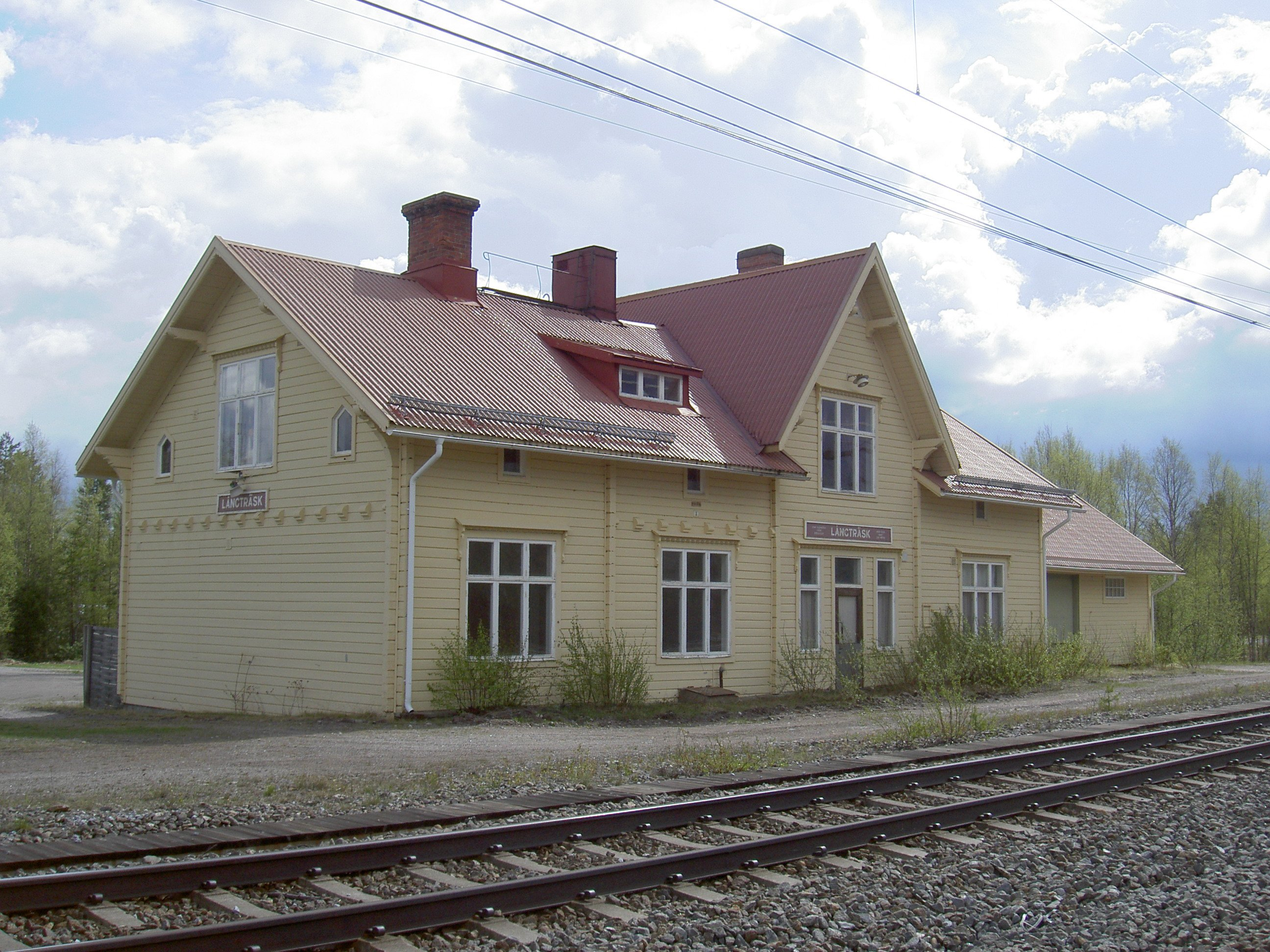
Långträsk station

Långträsk is a village (småort) in the Swedish Piteå Municipality. It got a train station in 1893, but there are no passengers being transported anymore. The village had 101 inhabitants in 2015

Near the village is the Länsväg 373.

The village has a station on the train line Boden – Bräcke.
