= Malexander murders =

Murders of two police officers at Malexander, Sweden

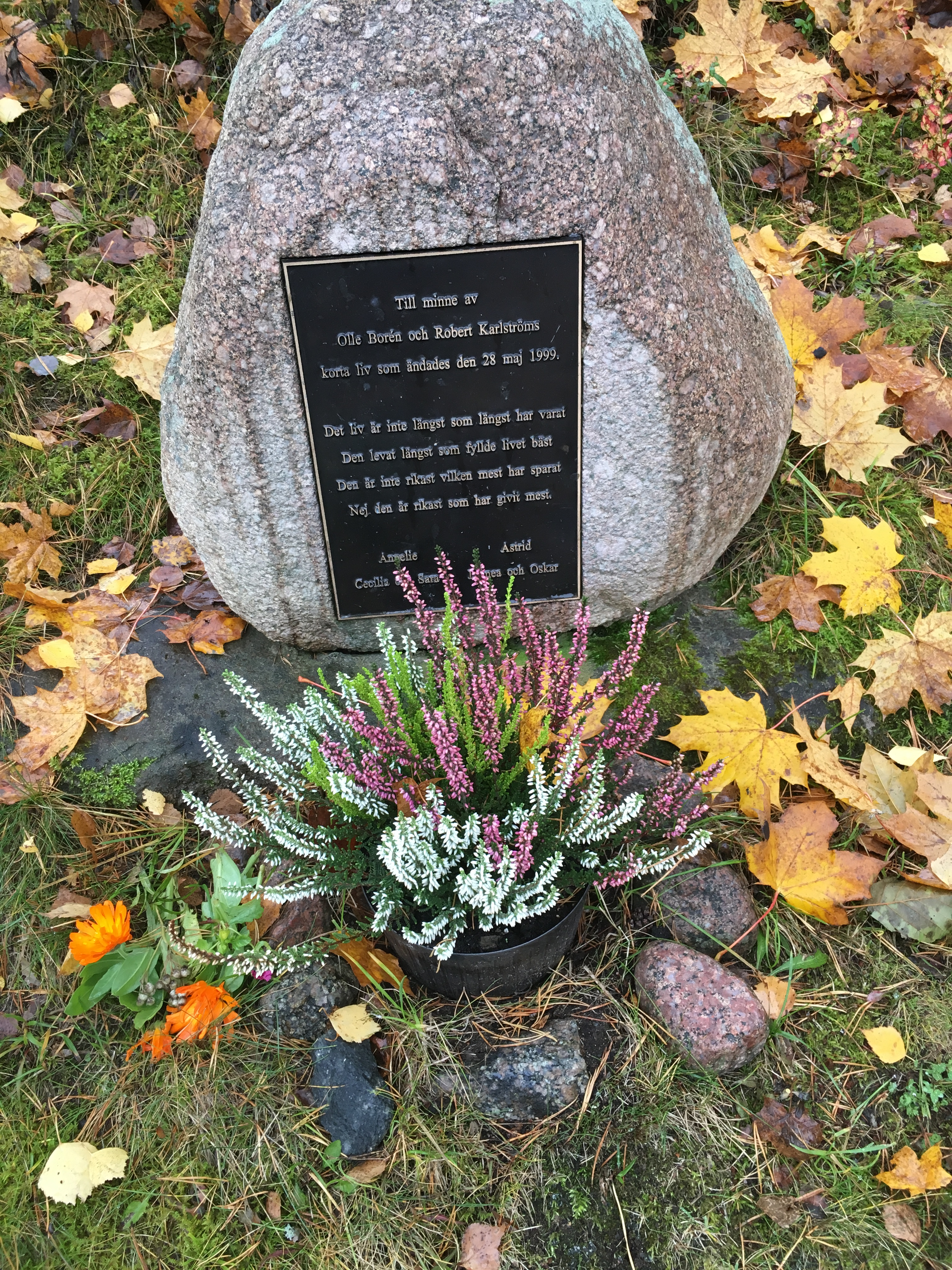
- The memorial stone of the murders in Malexander.

- Malexander (Östergötland) Malexander (Sweden)
- Location: 58°02′02″N 15°17′20″E; Malexander, Östergötland County, Sweden
- Date: 28 May 1999 c. 16:10 (CET)
- Target: Police officers
- Attack type: Shooting
- Weapon: SIG Sauer P228
- Deaths: 2
- Victims: Robert Karlström and Olle Borén
- Perpetrators: Jackie Arklöv, Tony Olsson, Andreas Axelsson
- Verdict: Guilty
- Convictions: Murder

The Malexander murders (Swedish: Malexandermorden) were the murders of two police officers, Robert Karlström and Olle Borén, at Malexander, Sweden, on 28 May 1999. The murders were committed after a bank robbery in Kisa earlier that day. Three men were convicted of the crimes, Tony Olsson, Andreas Axelsson and former mercenary Jackie Arklöv. The murders in Malexander were among the most high-profile cases in Sweden. The three perpetrators were active neo-Nazis and the robbery spree before the murders was committed as part of their plan to collect money to fund and create a "revolutionary" Nazi organisation.

== Commission of the crime ==
Of the three criminals, Andreas Axelsson was a computer instructor with only fines and social service on his record, whereas Tony Olsson was already serving a prison sentence at the time of the crime, but had received furlough from incarceration at Österåker Prison to participate in Lars Norén's play 7:3.

Using this opportunity, at 14:50 Arklöv and Axelsson entered Östgöta Enskilda Bank in Kisa, Östergötland. They waved pistols and grenades and wore ski masks on their faces. They shouted to people in the bank to lie down and not touch the alarms. They manipulated the cameras except one black-and-white camera. They opened the bank vault, which had a time-limited lock; during the lock-time they went around the bank collecting the cash. Outside of the bank, Olsson stood guard holding an Uzi and wearing a ski mask on his face. The loot was approximately 2.6 million Swedish kronor.

Kennet Eklund, the only police officer on duty at the local police station in Kisa, was dispatched to the scene after an alarm was set off. At 15:10, the robbers left the bank with the money and fled in a stolen Saab 9000.

Eklund followed them until they pulled over and the three suspects exited the car and began to fire on him. Eklund left the vehicle and escaped, trying to hide himself when the robbers threw grenades. He said that he heard a foreign male voice who shouted "Snutjäveln ligger gömd här nere i kärret!" ("The fucking cop lies hidden here down the fen!").

At 15:18 (CET) Olsson, Axelsson and Arklöv left the Saab and changed to a Toyota Avensis. While trying to stop the robbers, Swedish policemen Olov Borén (42) and Robert Karlström (30) were killed on a country road, with their own service pistols by shots to their heads. According to the Swedish National Laboratory of Forensic Science, Borén was shot five times, including once in the back of the head, and Karlström was shot three times, including once in the forehead. Both worked in Mjölby.

== Legal process ==
Axelsson, who was injured in the shooting, was captured at a local medical centre in Boxholm shortly after the murders. Arklöv was arrested in Tyresö three days after the robbery.

While evading arrest, Arklöv was shot in the lung. However, the injuries were not life-threatening. Olsson managed to escape the country (probably with help from his fiancée). He was arrested in Costa Rica about a week later on 6 June, and along with him about one million Swedish kronor from the loot was found. He was sent to Sweden a couple of weeks after his arrest.

The Linköping primary court indicted the three men on 26 October. All three were sentenced to life imprisonment, Axelsson and Olsson on 18 January and Arklöv on 2 February 2000. The sentences were upheld by the Svea Court of Appeal.

Olsson and Axelsson confessed to the bank robbery and admitted that they were present at Malexander, but denied committing the murders. Olsson claimed Arklöv alone killed the policemen, which Arklöv confessed to in June 2001. According to Arklöv, he took the policemen's own weapons and shot them point-blank, which corresponded with forensic investigation. The confession did not alter the verdicts for Axelsson or Olsson. The case, and most notably the life sentence for Axelsson, was heavily debated; as Sweden doesn't have a felony murder rule or doctrine of common purpose, the reality of sentencing the one member who had decidedly not committed the fatal shootings to the same sentence was considered harsh. At the time, the longest fixed sentence was 10 years in Swedish law (14 for cumulative offenses) which may have influenced the verdict.

Arklöv, who received a psychiatric evaluation to determine whether he could be sentenced to prison or psychiatric care, was later sentenced for war crimes, including the torture of Bosniak Muslim prisoners, which he had committed during the civil war in the former Yugoslavia as part of a Croatian paramilitary group.

Olsson was confined to Hall Prison. During the night of 27/28 July 2004, he escaped, but was captured two days later. On 27 November 2019, Tony Olsson (now named Byström), successfully saw his life sentence commuted to 35 years. Since he has been imprisoned since 1999 and Sweden uses a near-universal 2/3-measuring for parole, the commutation means he could be released on strict parole in 2022. Axelsson similarly had his sentence commuted to 35 years in 2020, and is scheduled for release in September 2022.
