= Malexander =

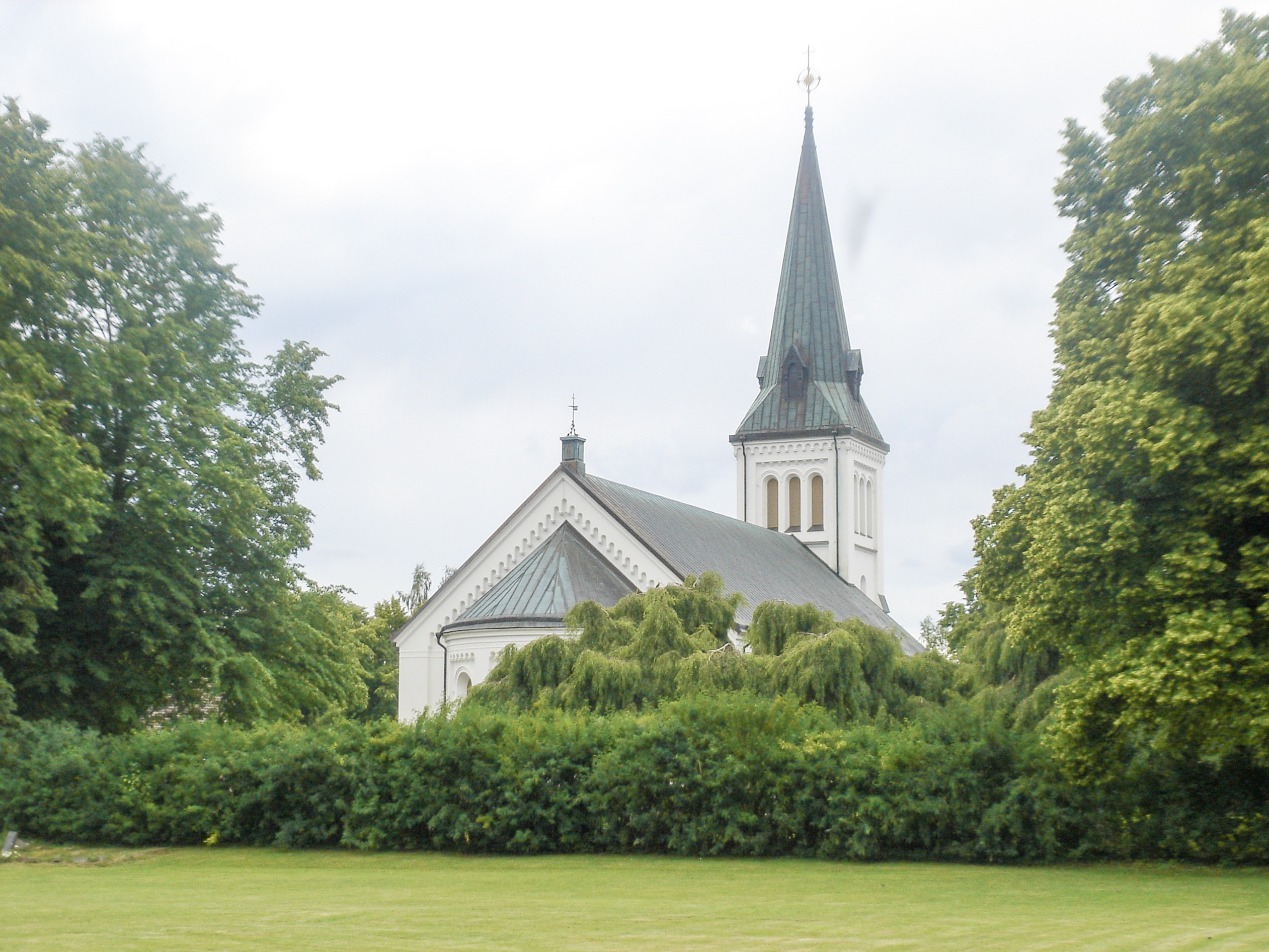
- Malexander Church

- Location within Östergötland Location within Sweden
- Coordinates: 58°02′N 15°17′E
- Country: Sweden
- Province: Östergötland
- County: Östergötland County
- Municipality: Boxholm Municipality

Area
  - Total: 0.25 km^{2} (0.097 sq mi)

Population (31 December 2005)
  - Total: 75
  - Density: 296/km^{2} (770/sq mi)
- Time zone: UTC+1 (CET)
  - Summer (DST): UTC+2 (CEST)

Malexander is a small village in Boxholm Municipality, Sweden, about 80 kilometres (50 mi) southwest of Linköping and 27 km (17 mi) southeast of Boxholm. It is located close to the lake Sommen and has a jetty where the steamboat S/S Boxholm II stops. It is well known for the 1999 Police Murders.

== History ==
There is evidence of a church in Malexander from at least the 13th century. The current church, Malexander Church, was built in 1881 and partly rebuilt following a fire in 1929.

== Malexander murders ==
On 28 May 1999, one of the most high-profile murders in Sweden took place in Malexander when two police officers were executed following a bank robbery in Kisa.

== Notable people ==
- Hilding Hagberg, chairman of the Swedish Communist Party (1951–1963)
- Sven Stolpe, author
- Bengt Åkerblom, author of Åkerblomstolen
- Pelle Björnlert, riksspelman.
