= Daniel Sachs =

Swedish businessman (born 1970)

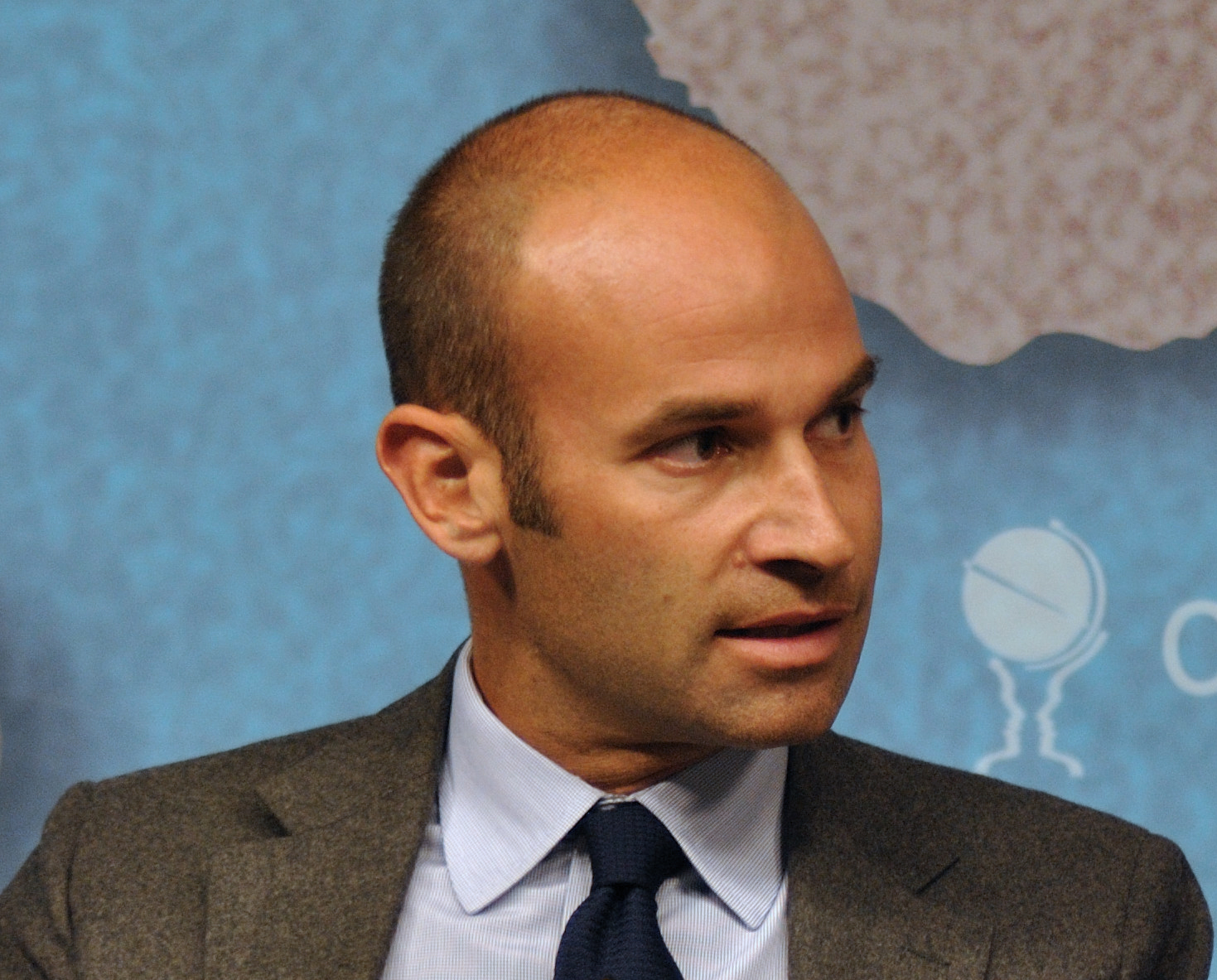
- Born: 2 April 1970 (age 55); Stockholm, Sweden
- Occupations: Businessman, entrepreneur, film producer
- Known for: Private equity leader and acted as executive producer in film production
- Spouse: Caroline Sachs
- Children: 3
- Parent(s): Joen Sachs (father) and Lisbeth Sachs (mother)
- Relatives: Josef Sachs (grandfather)

Joen Daniel Sachs, (born April 2, 1970) is a Swedish businessperson, entrepreneur and film producer.

== Early life and education ==
Sachs grew up in Stockholm. His father Joen Sachs is a professor of architecture and his mother Lisbeth Sachs Öhrling, is a social anthropologist. His grandfather, Ragnar Sachs, was the CEO of Nordiska Kompaniet (NK), which was started by Sachs' great-grandfather, Josef Sachs. Sachs' great-great-grandfather, Simon Sachs, came from Germany to Stockholm in the early 1850s to work at Joseph Leja's department store at Regeringsgatan 5.

Sachs holds an MBA (Master of Business Administration) from the Stockholm School of Economics and the Wharton School at the University of Pennsylvania.

== Career ==
He first worked in the private equity firm Segulah during the 1990s. He served as a board member of the Spray group from 1995, where he became CEO from 2000 to 2001, leading a significant restructuring and rescue operation during the dot-com bubble difficulties. Between 2003 and 2022, he served as the CEO of the investment firm Proventus.

He is also the founder and CEO of P Capital Partners, a lender and financial partner for entrepreneurial and family-owned businesses across Northern Europe. P Capital Partners was acquired by Sachs and its employees in 2013. Additionally, Sachs serves on the board of Wallenberg Investments AB.

In 2007, Sachs was named Young Global Leader by the World Economic Forum and has been attending most of the annual conferences celebrated in Davos. He is also a member of the European Council on Foreign Relations (ECFR), vice-chair of George Soros' Open Society Foundations, collaborator at Obama Foundation (Barack Obama's think tank) and an advisor to the Europe program at Chatham House in London

Sachs also became chairman of the Swedish TV channel TV4 in 2005 and was on the board of the Stockholm's Royal Dramatic Theatre from 2009 to 2017.

From 2000 he participated in film production companies, and has acted as executive producer for award-winning films and TV series, including Om Gud vill (2006), Cornelis (2010), and Gräns (2018). He was one of the hosts for the popular radio programme Sommar in 2013.

== Philanthropy ==
In 2010, he founded the Daniel Sachs Foundation, a non-partisan philanthropic organization dedicated to political thought and the defense of democracy. The foundation collaborates with other organizations such as Apolitical Foundation, Multitudes Foundation and Höj Rösten Politikerskola in Sweden.

In 2021, he founded the Foundation for Democracy & Pluralism, a fund that supports projects that aim to promote free and just societies with a strong anchoring in democratic principles.

== Personal life ==
Daniel Sachs is married to Caroline Sachs, former CEO of the Axfoundation, and has three children.

== Filmography (Executive Producer) ==
- 2006 – Om Gud vill
- 2008 – Downloading Nancy
- 2010 – Cornelis
- 2013 – Stockholm Stories
- 2018 – Gräns
- 2018 – Sthlm Rekviem (TV-serie)
- 2019 – Everything I Don't Remember (TV-serie)
- 2020 – Agent Hamilton (TV-serie)
- 2021 – Mamman (shortfilm)
