= Ready-to-assemble furniture =

Furniture that requires assembly upon opening

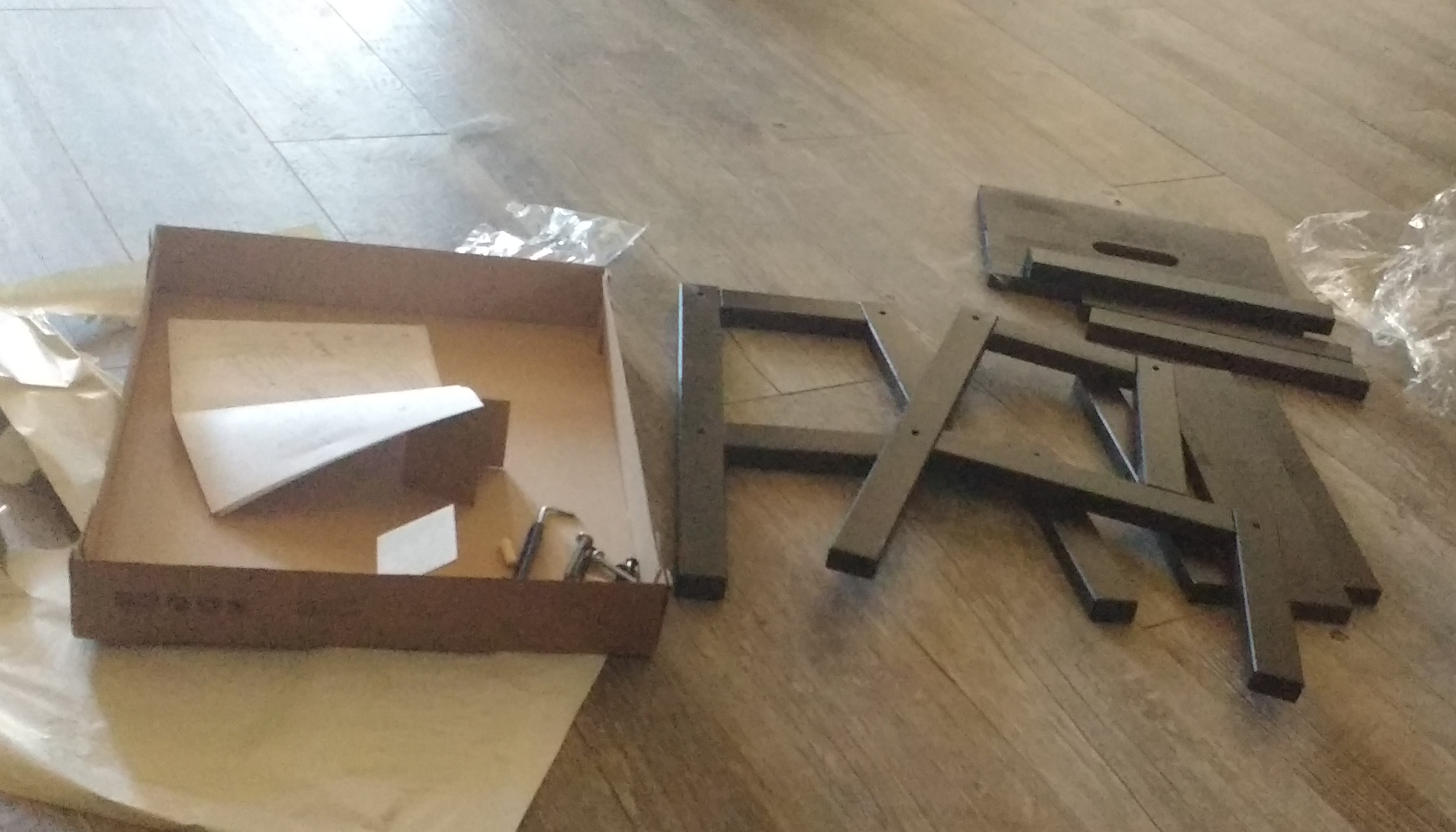
An unassembled IKEA flat-pack stool

Ready-to-assemble furniture (RTA), also known as knock-down furniture (KD), flat-pack furniture, or kit furniture, is a form of furniture that requires customer assembly. The separate components are packed for sale in cartons containing assembly instructions and sometimes hardware. The furniture is generally simple to assemble with basic tools such as hex keys, which are also sometimes included. Ready-to-assemble furniture is popular with consumers who wish to save money by assembling the product on their own.

Producers and merchants benefit from selling ready-to-assemble furniture, because furniture is bulky once assembled, and thus more expensive to store and to deliver. Since the assembly work is done by the consumer instead of by the manufacturer, its price can be lower. A furniture assembly service industry has developed, making it easy for consumers to employ someone knowledgeable to assemble their furniture for them.

Produced mainly from particle board or medium-density fibreboard (MDF), the cost of producing this type of furniture is cheaper than using solid wood. The low grade timber is coated with a polymer laminate to replicate various types of wood, allowing a high-quality-looking finished product.

== History ==
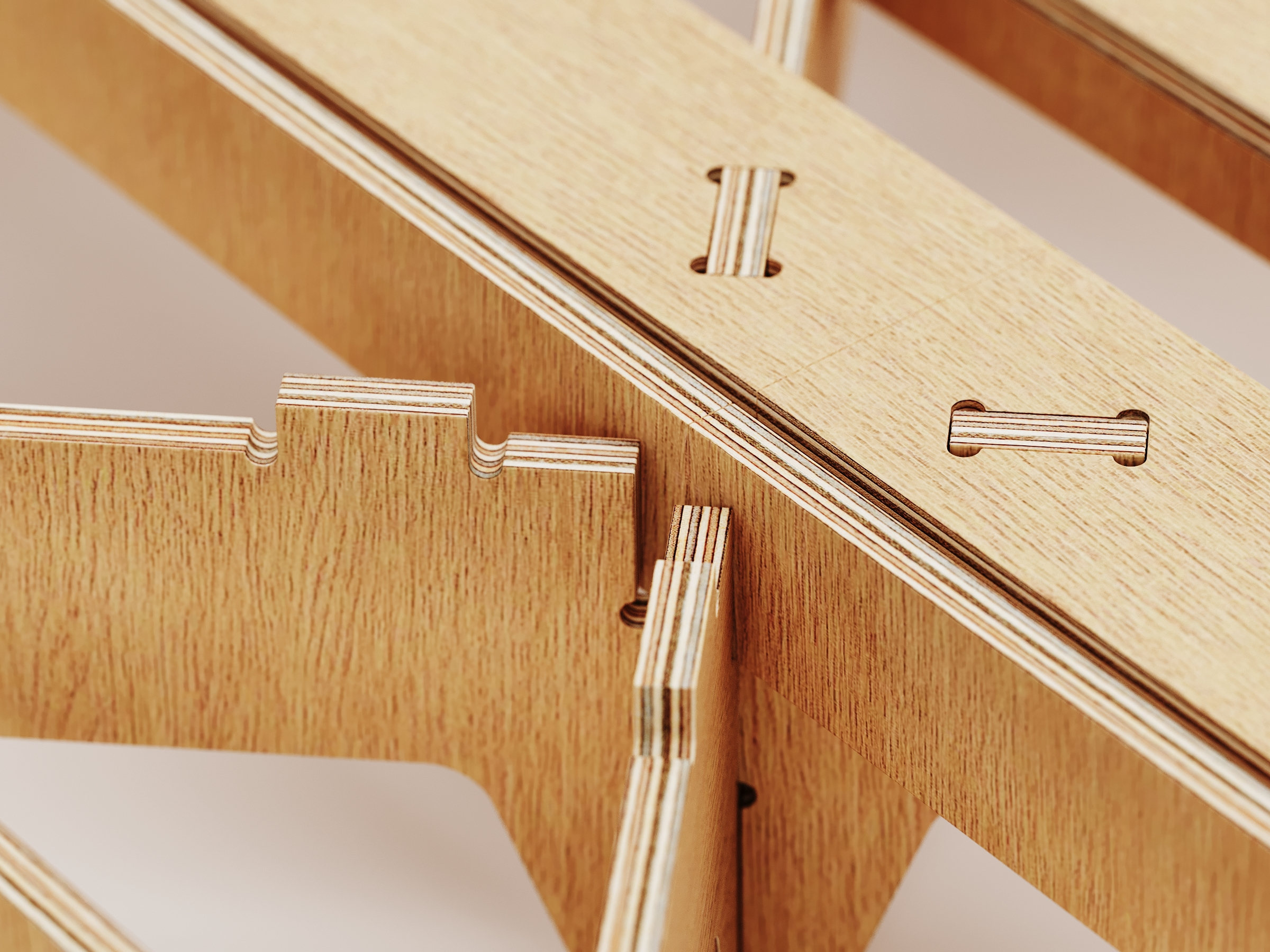
A detail of an open-source bedframe design, made from CNC-cut plywood

Ready-to-assemble furniture has roots that extend back a long way, as cabinetmakers have been making furniture that is easy to disassemble for transport for centuries. The New American Cyclopaedia of 1859 listed the assembly of furniture as an "American invention" that emphasized ease of transport, but this claim is rather vague. A better claim to the earliest RTA furniture is the Thonet No. 14 bentwood chair, which was specifically made to be easily disassembled to save space during transportation. It was first produced in 1859. Slightly later there is an American patent of 1878 that defines some prefabricated furniture as follows: "The invention refers to a class of furniture in kit to be packaged and transported in pieces and assembled by specialized and unqualified people."

An early attempt at a business selling RTA furniture was set up by designer Louise Brigham and two partners during World War I. By 1915, Home Art Masters was offering RTA furniture kits at moderate prices through a mail-order catalog. The buyer received a set of parts that the company stated could be “quickly put together and finished. Everything including instructions, furnished. A boy or girl can set it up.” Home Art Masters was short-lived and it is uncertain how many of their RTA furniture kits were ever sold.

The next experiments in running an RTA business stem from the 1940s and 1950s. In the late 1940s, the Australian designer Frederick Charles Ward founded a mail-order RTA furniture business because he was disturbed by how little affordable furniture there was for people of modest means. Lena Larsson helped to create one of the earliest Swedish brands of ready to assemble furniture, the TRIVA line, for Nordiska Kompaniet in 1943. In 1953, the Ohio cabinetmaker Erie J. Sauder received the first U.S. patent for RTA furniture for a table that could be assembled without either hardware or glue; he called it "snap-together" furniture. In Brazil in 1952 Michel Arnoult created his company Mobilia Cotemporânea, creating the Peg Lev chair.

In the Scandinavian countries, the furniture kit may have been independently invented by Swedish technician Gillis Lundgren, who had the idea when trying to transport a table in his car. According to reports, he had to saw off the table's legs so he could put it inside the car and take it home. He talked about the idea with his boss at IKEA, and IKEA started selling flat-pack furniture in 1956.

== Uses ==
Ready-to-assemble furniture can be purchased for a number of purposes:

- Living room furniture
- Office furniture
- Bookcases
- Tables
- Beds
- Lounge-ware
- Outdoor furniture
- Swingsets
- Patio sets
- Kitchen cabinets
- CD/DVD storage racks
- Wardrobes/closets
- Desks

== See also ==
- Campaign furniture
- Knock-down kit
