= Tranås =

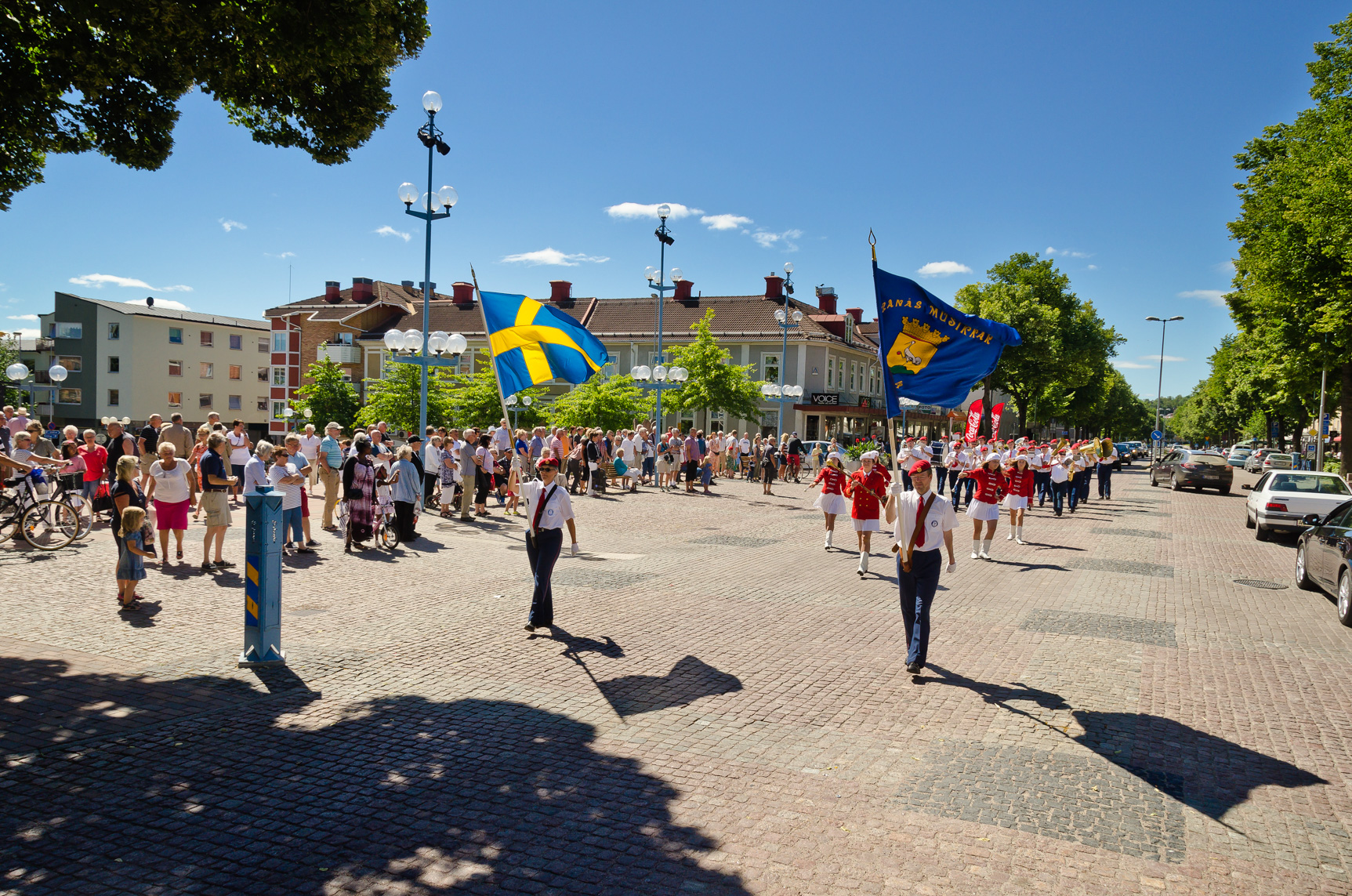
- Summer in Tranås

- Location within Jönköping Location within Sweden
- Coordinates: 58°02′N 14°58′E
- Country: Sweden
- Province: Småland
- County: Jönköping County
- Municipality: Tranås Municipality

Area
  - Total: 10.56 km^{2} (4.08 sq mi)

Population (31 December 2010)
  - Total: 14,197
  - Density: 1,345/km^{2} (3,480/sq mi)
- Time zone: UTC+1 (CET)
  - Summer (DST): UTC+2 (CEST)

Tranås (Swedish pronunciation: [ˈtrɑ̂ːnoːs]) is a locality and the seat of Tranås Municipality, Jönköping County, Sweden with 14,197 inhabitants in 2010.

== Overview ==
It is close to the lake Sommen in the north of Småland. Its main commercial center is located along the main street, Storgatan. The symbol of the town is the crane as featured on the town's coat of arms. Some of the bigger employers in the town are Strömsholmen, Pastejköket, OEM, EFG (European Furniture Group) and IVT.

The company Stiga was founded by Stig Hjelmquist in Tranås 1934. Since 2005 there is free bus service in the central part of town.

The town is also the home of Wood House, a major table tennis blade manufacturing facility

== Notable people ==
- Ove Fundin, speedway racer
- Simon Holmström, ice hockey player
- Lennart Hyland, television host
- Lena Larsson, interior designer
- Dénis Lindbohm, author
- David Lingmerth, professional golfer
- Magnus Svensson, professional ice hockey player
- Anders Wilander, professional ice hockey player

== Twin town ==
- Taksony, Hungary (2025)
