= Anders Wilander =

- Born: January 28, 1955 (age 71) Örebro, Närke, Sweden
- Position: Forward
- Shot: Right
- Playing career: 1969–1987

Anders Wilander is a Swedish former ice hockey player.

== Biography ==
Anders Wilander began his professional ice hockey career with Alvesta SK, spending part of that time playing in Hockeytvåan. He later joined HV71, with whom he was eventually promoted to Hockeyettan. In 1977, Wilander was a member of the HV71 team that finished atop the regular season standings in the league.

Playing for Tranås AIF, Wilander spent most of the remainder of his playing career in the next division below once again, but the club did have a brief stint in Hockeyattan in the 1980–81 season. Eventually, Wilander returned to HV71 as its chairman. He led them to a HockeyAllsvenskan Championship in the 2021–22 season, before stepping down in October 2023 due to health reasons.

In addition to his ice hockey career, Wilander spend more than 20 years as a politician, including as the longtime Chairman of the Tranås Municipal Board. He is a member of the Moderate Party.

Wilander is the brother of International Tennis Hall of Fame inductee and eight-time Grand Slam champion Mats Wilander. In 1984, he married Elisabeth Danielsson. Their son Hjalmar Wilander also played professional hockey for several years.
