= Dénis Lindbohm =

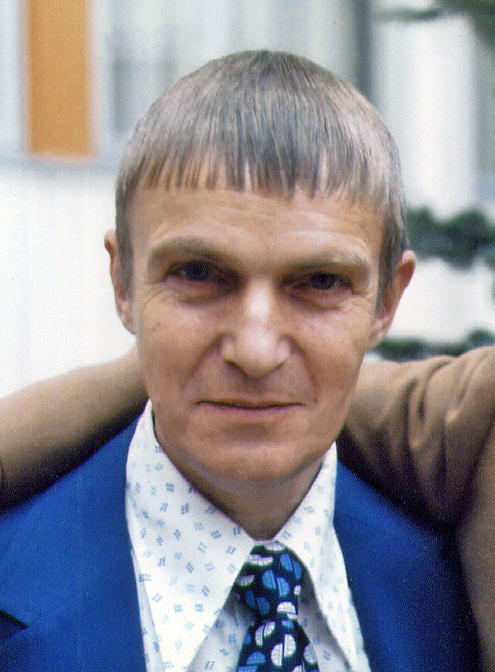
- Dénis Lindbohm ca 1970.
- Born: Ernst Rune Denis Lindbom; July 11, 1927; Tranås
- Died: October 24, 2005 (aged 78); Malmö
- Occupation: Author
- Years active: 1965 - 2005
- Known for: Science fiction.
- Children: 3

Dénis Lindbohm (July 11, 1927 – October 24, 2005) was a Swedish author and occultist and is considered one of the founders of Swedish science fiction. In his early years, he worked as a photographic technician in Malmö and became involved in the nascent Swedish science fiction fandom. In the mid-1960s he became a full-time writer.

== Bibliography ==
- Draksådd ("Dragon Seed") (mimeographed issue, 1965)
- Mörker över Malmö ("Darkness over Malmö") (1969)
- Mörkrets fåra ("Furrow of Darkness") (1970)
- Jagets eld ("Fire of the Ego") (1971)
- Soldat från jorden ("Soldier from Earth") (1973; based on an earlier draft previously published as a serial in the Swedish science fiction fanzine SF-Forum)
- Stjärnpesten ("The Star Plague") (1975)
- Eden utan Adam ("Eden without Adam") (1975)
- Flygande gift ("Flying Poison") (1975)
- Stjärnvargen ("The Star Wolf") (1978)
- Domens stjärnor ("The Stars of Doom") (1978; full text version at Projekt Runeberg)
- Den gyllene randen ("The Golden Edge") (1979)
- Regression (1979)
- Nattens lösen ("Password for the Night") (1979)
- Bevingaren ("The Bewinger") (1980)
- Frostens barn ("Children of the Frost") (1980)
- Solens vargar ("Wolves of the Sun") (1980)
- A-ett ("A-One") (1980)
- Eko över bron ("Echo over the Bridge") (1982)
- Edens nyckel ("Eden's Key") (1982)
- Domens rötter ("The Roots of Doom") (1983)
- Eldens barn ("Children of the Fire") (1983)
- Nattsidan ("The Nightside") (1983)
- Gaias gudbarn ("Gaia's Godchildren") (1983)
- Spegelspelet ("The Mirror Game") (1984)
- Allt har sin tid ("Everything has its Time") (1984)
- Vägens förra slut ("The Former End of the Road") (1984)
- Glömda gudars väg ("The Way of Forgotten Gods") (1985)
- Vatten över huvud taget ("Water above Head Taken") (1985)
- Blå tornet ("The Blue Tower") (1985)
- Siaren som sover ("The Seer that Sleeps") (1985)
- Vägen bortom Lövestad ("The Road beyond Lövestad") (1986)
- Domedagens skymning ("Doomsday's Twilight") (1986)
- Evig exil ("Eternal Exile") (1986)
- Droppar av dis och eld ("Droplets of Mist and Fire")(1987)
- Världförvist (1987)
- Trollmakt ("Enchanting Power") (1987)
- Dockan från Fomalhaut ("The Doll from Fomalhaut") (1987)
- Pentagram, Maktens portal ("Pentagram, the Portal of Power") (1988)
- Det kom en orm till Eden ("A Snake came to Eden") (1988)
- Skuggor över Elysion ("Shadows over Elysion") (1989)
- Spegelns tredje sida ("The Third Face of the Mirror") (1989)
- Blod på solen ("Blood on the Sun") (1990)
- Den magiska gåvan ("The Magical Gift") (1990)
- Där blott andar vandrar ("Where only Spirits Wander") (1991)
- Stjärnbollen ("The Star Ball") (1991)
- Ljuset är själens färg ("The Light is the Colour of the Soul") (1992)
- Den trolska världen ("The Enchanting World") (1992)
- Magins system ("The System of Magic") (1993)
- Vägen som mörkret belyste ("The Road that Darkness Shone upon") (1993)
- Fången är den fries dröm ("Imprisoned is the Dream of the Free") (1994)
- Bortom barriären ("Beyond the Barrier") (1994)
- Gudarnas lekskola ("Playschool of the Gods") (1995)
- Pentagram – Maktens portal (2nd edition) (1995)
- Vi som är svärmen ("We who are the Swarm") (1996)
- Möten med makterna ("Encounters with the Powers") (1996)
- Magins program ("The Program of Magic") (1997)
- Legenden av stoft och stjärnor ("The Legend of Dust and Stars") (1997)
- Magi ("Magic") (1998)
- Genom det inres port ("Through the Gateway of the Inner") (1998)
- Drömmens dimension ("The Dimension of the Dream") (1998)
- Makten som skapar och förgör ("The Power that Creates and Annihilates") (1999)
- De ofödda ("The Unborn") (1999)
- Bevingaren (New edition) (2000)
- Vid stjärnhjulets rand ("At the Edge of the Star Wheel") (2000)
- Vägen genom pentagram ("The Way through Pentagram") (2001)
- Magins problem ("The Problem of Magic") (2002)
- Makten som botar ("The Power that Cures") (2002)
- Vi möttes i Babylon ("We met in Babylon") (2003)
- Väktarna vid världens rand ("The Guardians at the Edge of the World")(2003)
- Pentagrams andra sida ("The other Side of Pentagram") (2004)
- Den inre väktaren ("The inner Guardian") (2004)
- Världar runt hörnet ("Worlds around the Corner") (2005)
- Kvatur-Glon (2005)
