= Josef Sachs =

Swedish businessman

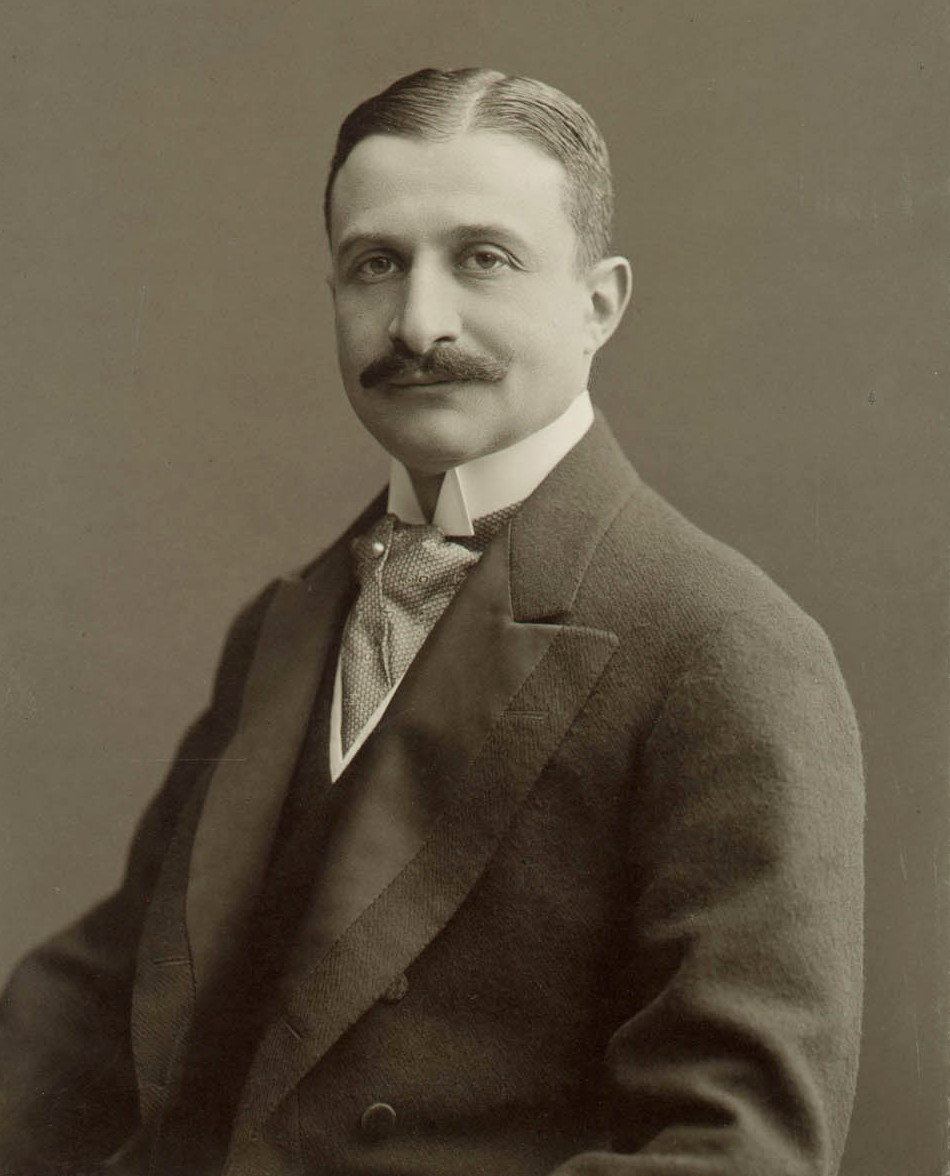
Photo of Sachs, taken 1900-1920.

Josef Ernst Sachs (1872-1949) was a Swedish businessman and one of the two founders of the Nordiska Kompaniet department store in Stockholm.

Born on January 4, 1872, in Stockholm, he became a student there in 1890. Devoting himself to commercial exercises abroad, upon his return he worked with his father and later became president of the Josef Leja department store in 1902. He would later serve as president of Nordiska Kompaniet from 1902–37, Deputy Chairman of the Board 1933-44, then chairman of the firm until his death in 1949. He was awarded the Illis quorum in the twelfth size in 1930 by the King of Sweden.
