= Lena Larsson =

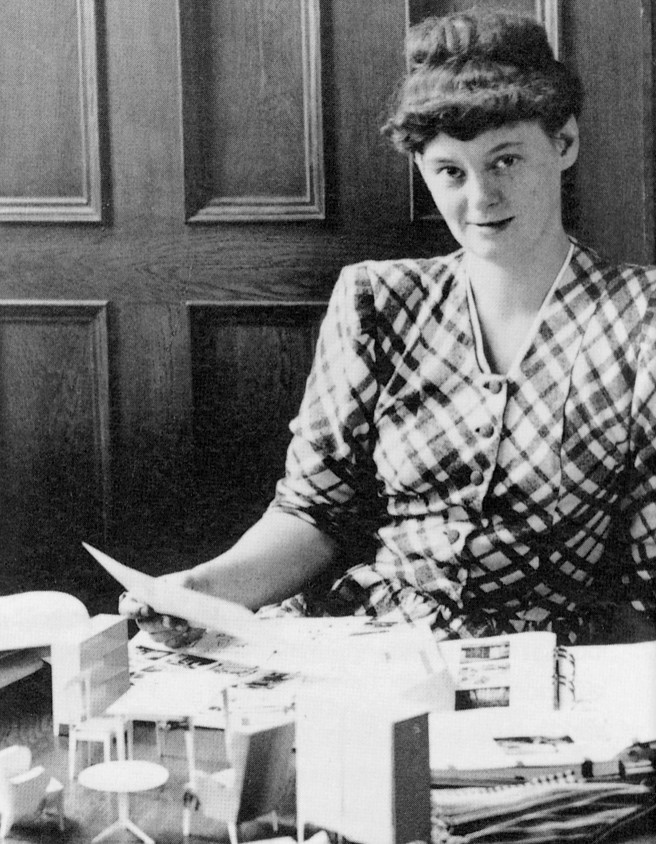
Lena Larsson in the 1940s

Lena Larsson, (née Rabenius; 31 July 1919 – 4 April 2000), was a Swedish interior designer, known as a pioneer for the unconventional, family-friendly environments she created, and for the 1960s modern wear-and-tear ideal. She was married in 1940 to architect Mårten Larsson and they had four children. She was a member of the Rabenius family belonging to the Swedish nobility.

== Biography ==
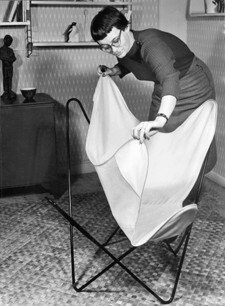
Lena Larsson at NK in 1950.

Larsson was born Lena Rabenius in 1919 in Tranås. She trained as a cabinetmaker at the Carl Malmstens school of craftsmanship. After that she worked for cabinetmaker Elias Svedberg, with whom she designed furniture. In the early 1940s, she was employed by Svenska Slöjdföreningen (now Svensk Forum) and Svenska Arkitekters Riksförbund to make a survey of peoples' home lives. She interviewed housewives about how they were using their homes during the early 1940s. The results of the survey were to be used as a template for the building of convenient homes after the Second World War.

At Hälsingborgsmässan H55, she, together with architects Anders-William Olsson and Mårten Larsson, created the one-family house Skal och kärna. From 1956 until 1960, she was the chief editor of the home decoration magazine Allt i hemmet. As an artistic leader in the Nordiska Kompaniet (The Nordic Company) store, NK-bo, she used her knowledge to create home design solutions for the simplification of domestic lifestyles. Larssen, together with her colleagues Svedborg and Erik Worts, designed the TRIVA line of furniture which won a contest held by the Swedish Society of Crafts & Design. It was launched by NK in 1944 and was noted for its inexpensiveness and versatility. It was the first of its kind, predating the similar IKEA brand of knock-down furniture. NK-bo and NK-bo NU was a special store within NK between 1947 and 1956, and from 1961 to 1965, which sold cheap and experimental furniture for the entire family. It also became a forum for ideas and products to be tested by young designers. By this means she opened the way for both established and new designers and furniture makers. Larsson also taught home planning courses.
