= Nordiska Kompaniet =

Swedish department store

Coordinates: 59.33304°N 18.07079°E

- Company type: Private
- Industry: Retail
- Genre: Department Store
- Founded: 1902 (Stockholm); 1964 (Gothenburg)
- Founder: Josef Sachs, Karl Ludvig Lundberg
- Headquarters: Hamngatan; Stockholm, Sweden and Östra Hamngatan; Gothenburg, Sweden
- Products: Quality and luxury goods
- Owner: Hufvudstaden AB
- Website: NK.se

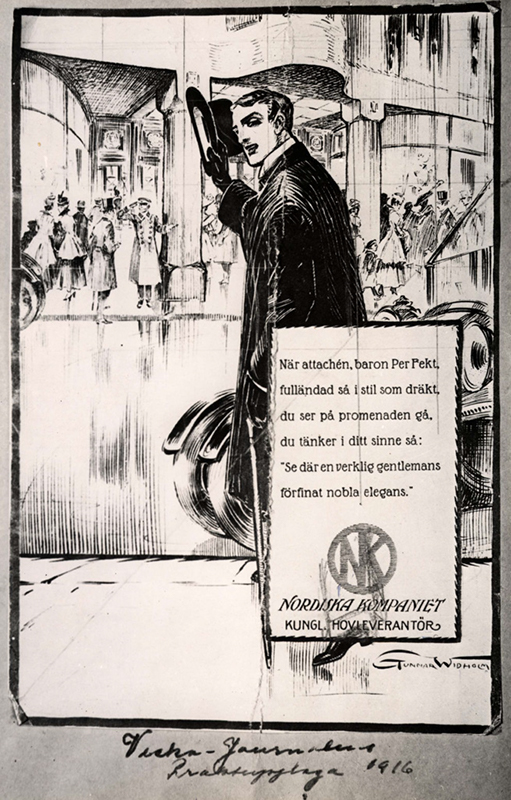
Ad from 1915.

Nordiska Kompaniet (colloquially NK, and literally The Nordic Company) is the name of two luxury department stores located in Stockholm and Gothenburg, in Sweden.

The store in Stockholm receives some twelve million visitors annually, with the figure for the store in Gothenburg being about three million and the total number of staff around 1,200. The trademark and the real estate properties in Gothenburg and Stockholm are owned by Hufvudstaden AB, controlled by L E Lundbergföretagen publ (see Fredrik Lundberg).

Nordiska Kompaniet was a founder and remained member of the International Association of Department Stores from 1928 to 1991.

== History ==
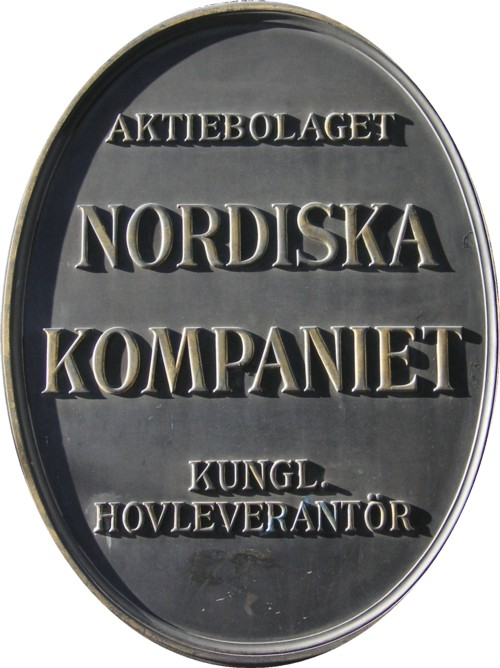

The company was founded in Stockholm 1902 through the merger of the two companies K.M. Lundberg and Joseph Leja. The men responsible for the merger were Karl Ludvig Lundberg and Josef Sachs (1872–1949), who wanted to establish a department store that would offer the same level of service as the stores in Paris or London.

On September 21, 1915, the building designed and built especially for the department store was inaugurated on Hamngatan, over the street from the Kungsträdgården park in Stockholm. Ferdinand Boberg, Sweden's leading Art Nouveau architect, designed the building. He was influenced by American department stores, giving the structure an internal load-bearing steel structure and an external facade of granite. Ivar Kreuger's company Kreuger & Toll was responsible for the actual construction of the building.

In 1934, the company opened a branch store in Buenos Aires, Argentina.

About 1939 NK installed a circular neon sign with a diameter of 7 meters on the Old Stockholm telephone tower. The telephone wires were replaced by underground cabling in the early 20th century and the tower had since been rented by the telephone company for commercial purposes. The sign was constructed by L M Ericsson. One side of the sign features the NK logo in green, the other side a clock in red. It weighs four tons and revolves at four rpm.

In the 1930s, the company specialized in old-fashioned luxury furniture, which had begun to go out of vogue in Sweden due to changing tastes and living conditions. In 1943, artistic director Lena Larsson, Elias Svedberg and Erik Worts developed the cheaper, more versatile TRIVA line of knock-down furniture, which marked the company's pivot to more furniture design. The TRIVA line was similar to IKEA model of ready-to-assemble furniture.

In 1952, the building under the tower was fire-ravaged and the steel tower severely damaged. The neon sign was however not affected by the fire and since 1964 it sits on a custom-designed tower on the NK building's roof, 87 meters above street level.

The building was extended in 1961–63 by architect Hans Asplund along the facade on Regeringsgatan. The extension stands on the former lot of Stockholm's old electric power plant, which remarkably was the first major work by NK's original architect Boberg. In 1971–73 a smaller addition was made by architect Bengt Lindroos when part of the street Smålandsgatan was closed and converted into a building lot. Nordiska Kompaniet (NK) is also the name of the well known design company which produced many popular design commodities in the 20th century.

== Pictures ==
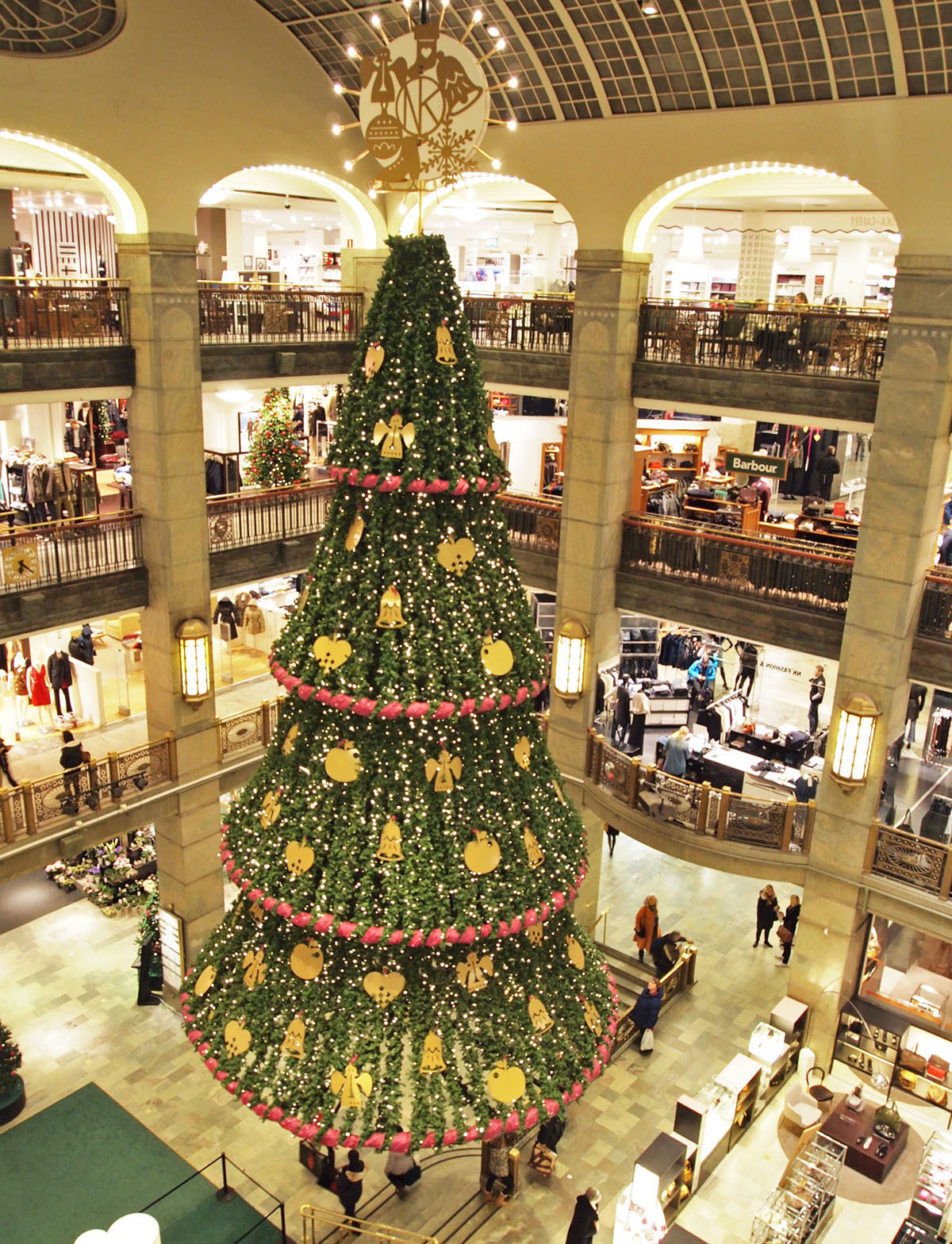
NK during the 2011–2012 Christmas and holiday season

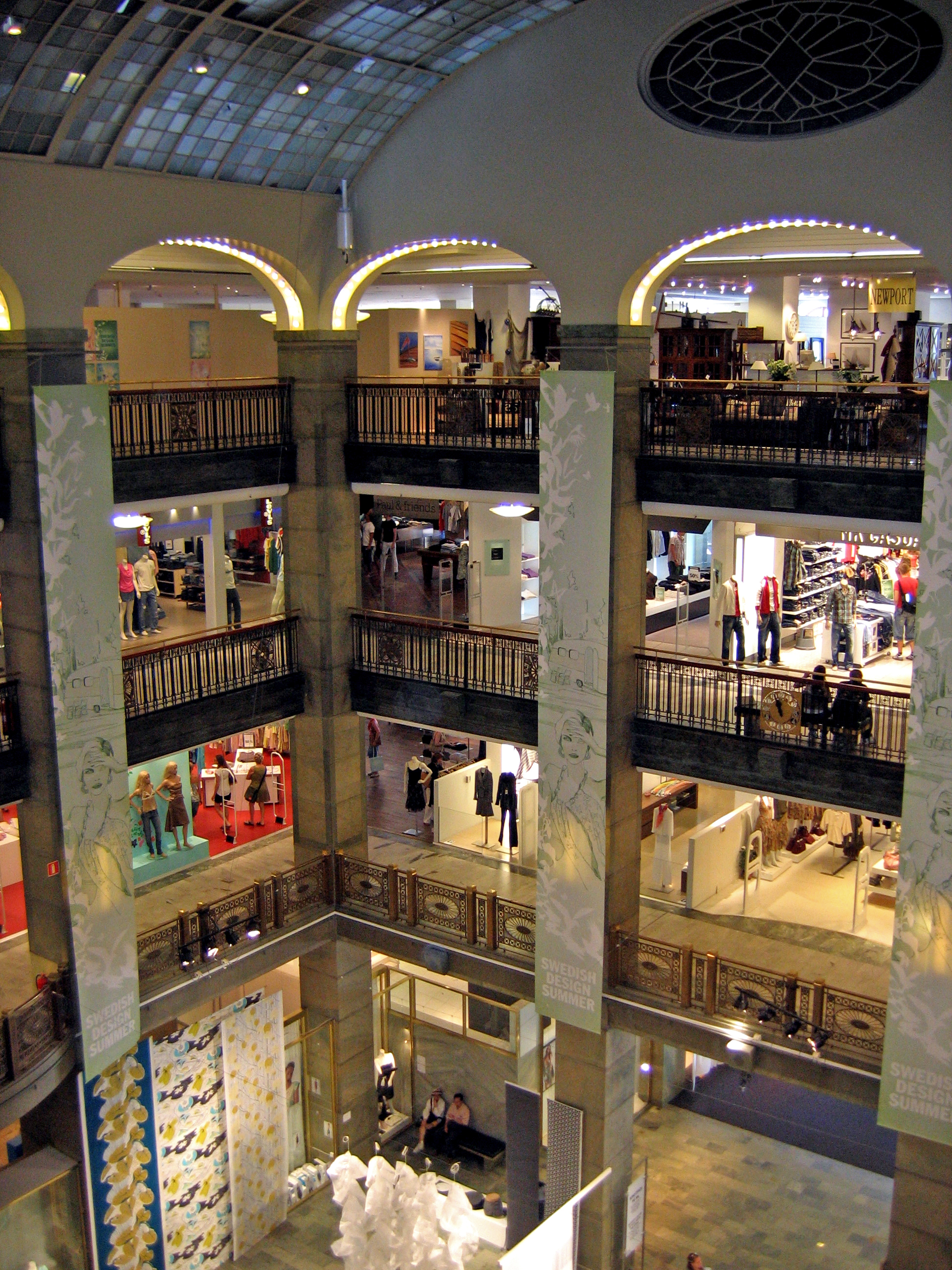

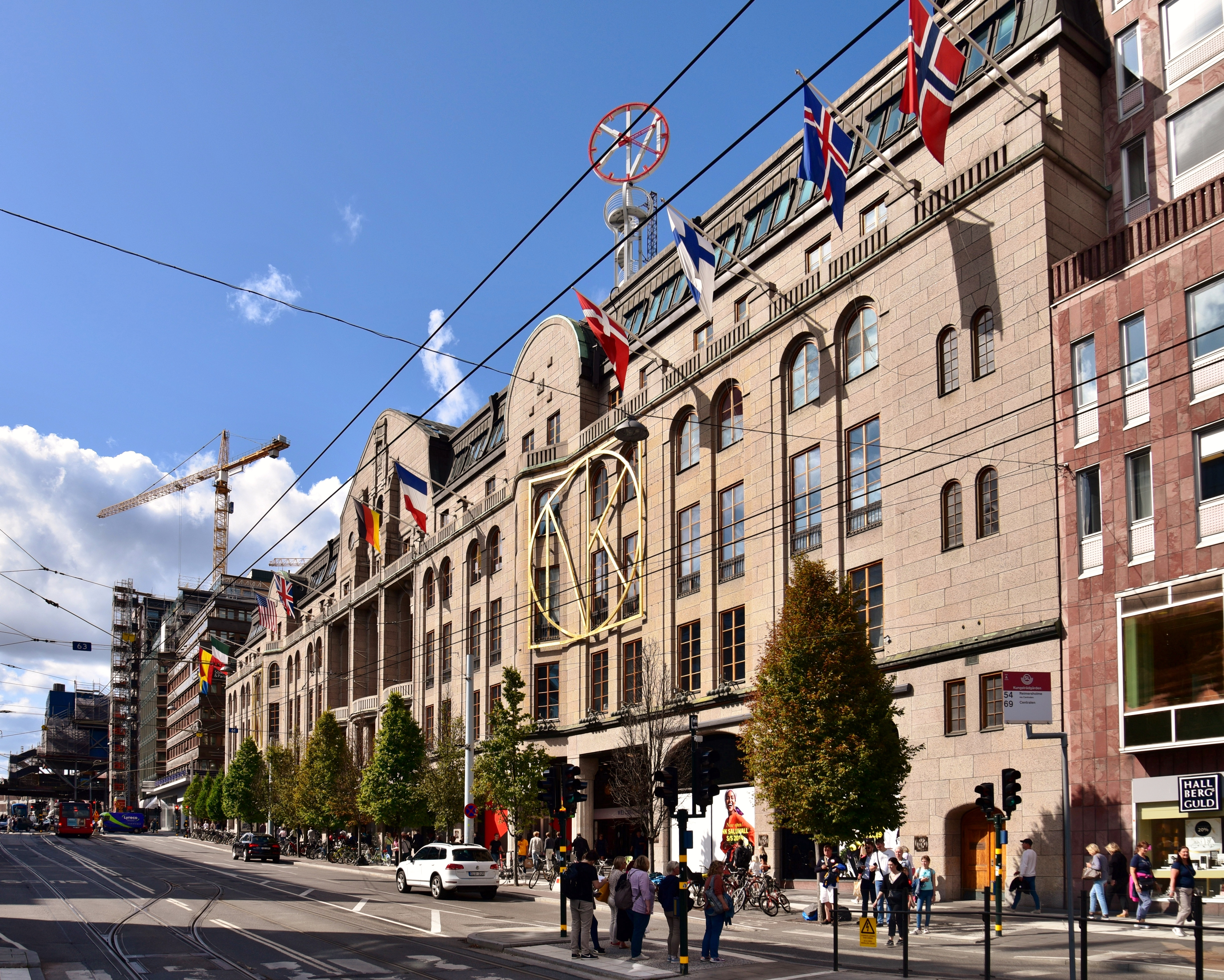

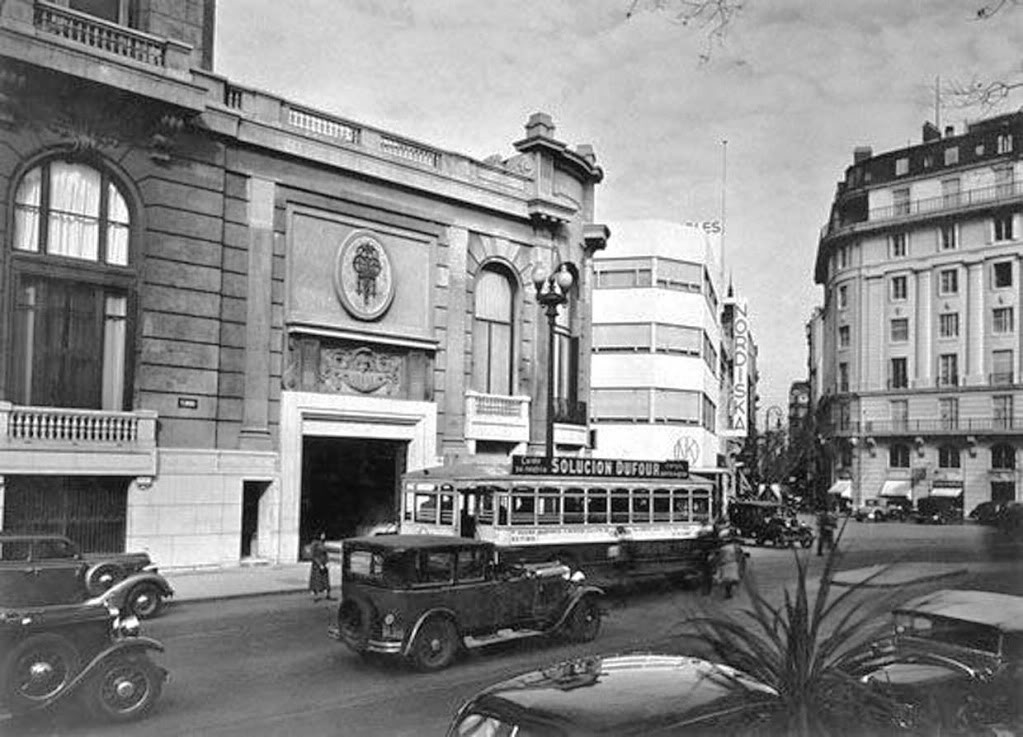
NK store in Buenos Aires, 1936
