= Blood Road (disambiguation) =

Blood Road is a Norwegian road.

Blood Road may also refer to:

- Blodveien (film) (The Bload Road), a 1955 Norwegian-Yugoslav drama film
- Blood Road (film), a 2017 American documentary film
- The Blood Road, a 2018 detective novel by Logan McRae
- Blood Road Museum, a Norwegian museum
