= Blodveien =

Blodveien may refer to:

- Blodveien (film) (The Blood Road), a Norwegian-Yugoslav film from 1955
- Blood Road (Norwegian: Blodveien), a route in Nordland county, Norway
