= Blood Road =

WWII route and POW camp in Norway

Coordinates: 67°06′N 15°29′E

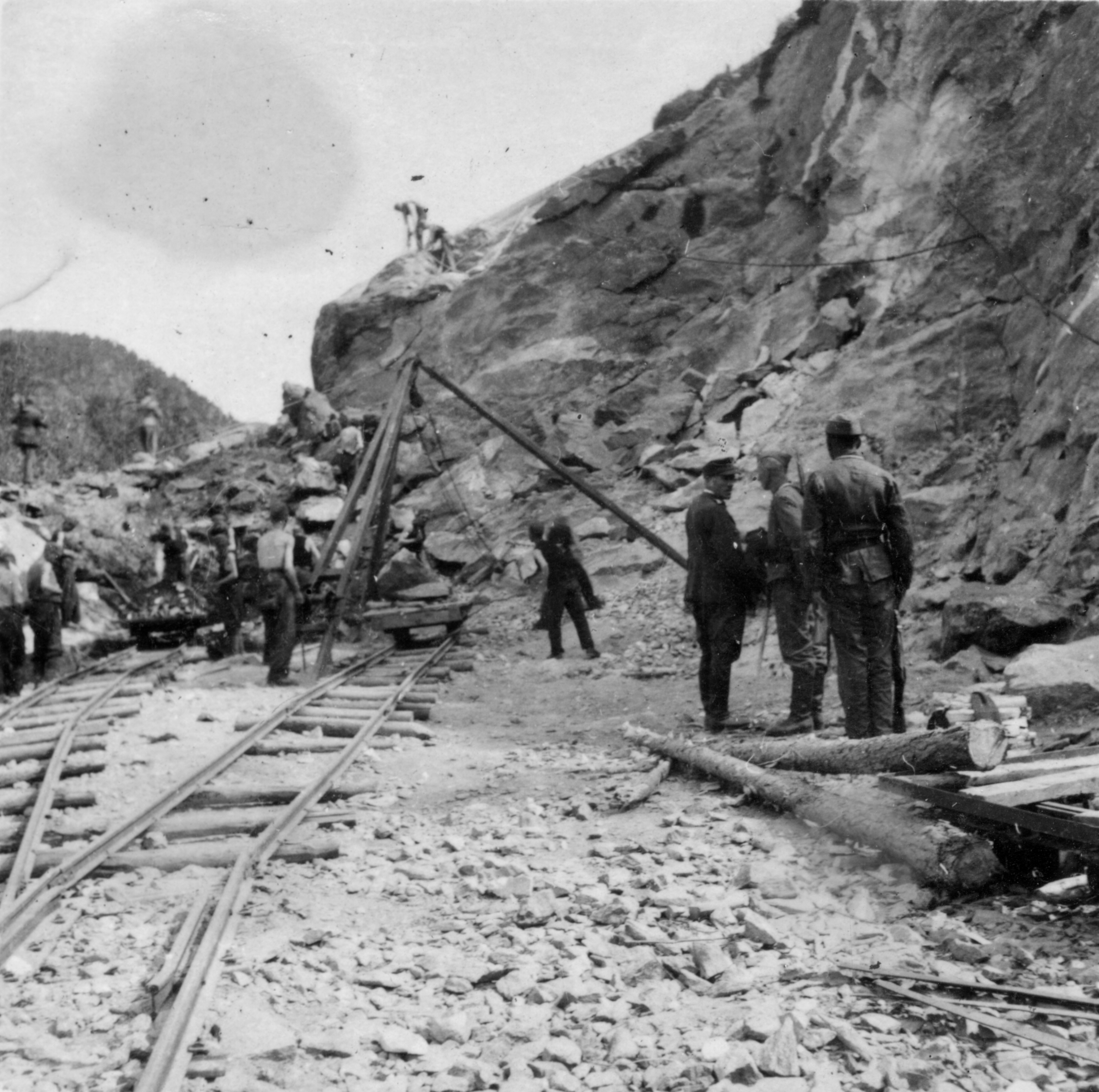
Construction work between Rognan and Botn on Highway 50 (now E6), known as the Blood Road.

The Blood Road (Norwegian: Blodveien) is a route northeast of Rognan in Saltdal Municipality in Nordland county, Norway that was built by prisoners during the Second World War. The route was a new section of Norwegian National Road 50 between Rognan and Langset on the east side of Saltdal Fjord (Saltdalsfjorden), where there was a ferry service before the war. The specific incident that gave the road its name was a cross of blood that was painted on a rock cutting in June 1943. The blood came from a prisoner that was shot along the route, and the cross was painted by his brother.

The prisoners lived in a primitive camp in the village of Botn, just 2 kilometers (1.2 mi) outside Rognan. The prisoners of war had very small daily rations, long working hours, poor clothing for winter use, primitive barracks, and miserable sanitation, and they were treated cruelly. The Botn camp was first led by the SS, and under their direction mass executions were also carried out.

When the Wehrmacht took over management of the Botn camp in October 1943, the conditions gradually improved. The conditions further improved when the Red Cross learned of the camps and several inspections were conducted.

The Botn camp was one of five original prisoner-of-war camps in Northern Norway. The camp held prisoners from Yugoslavia, the Soviet Union, and Poland. The youngest prisoners of war were barely 12 years old. The conditions at all five camps were poor with high mortality. The number of prisoners in the Botn camp can only be estimated from testimonies of survivors. Almost 900 prisoners in total arrived at the camp; of these, about half died through execution, punishment, malnutrition, and exhaustion.

By the war's end there were around 7,500 prisoners of war in Saltdal, but the number is uncertain. There were up to 18 camps from Saltfjellet and north to Saltdal Fjord, but the treatment that prisoners received in these camps was considerably better. In the trials held after the war, the camps were referred to as extermination camps. It shocked the Norwegian authorities that the Norwegian youths as young as 16 had served as guards in the camp. The youths were members of the Hirdvaktbataljon (Guard Battalion of the Hird) set up under the NS Ungdomsfylking (the Nasjonal Samling youth organization), and they treated the prisoners of war cruelly. In the postwar trials several Norwegian guards received prison sentences, and some of the German SS officers were sentenced to death by firing squad.

== Background ==
=== Building the road and rail connections ===
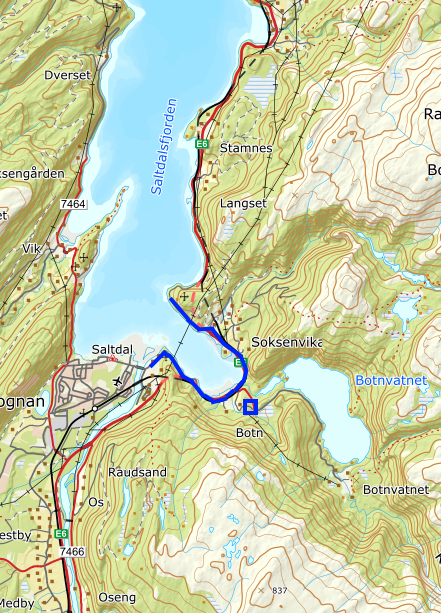
The blue line marks the stretch of road near Rognan where work was done by Yugoslavs on Highway 50. The stretch is one of several places in Norway known as the Blood Road. The Botn Prison Camp is marked as a blue box. The red line marks European route E6.

During the occupation of Norway in the Second World War, the German forces had enormous transport needs, particularly in Northern Norway, where, among other things, they needed to bring supplies to the north front, transport ore from LKAB via Narvik, nickel from Finland, and personnel and material throughout the entire region. Transport by ship along the Norwegian coast was hazardous due to allied bombing. The road network was poor and insufficiently developed. The Nordland Line went no further north than Mosjøen, and on the trunk roads there were many ferry crossings. Railroad development was centrally seen as the only solution to obtain satisfactory transport. Adolf Hitler ordered the rapid development of the Polar Line to Kirkenes; the German commander in Norway, Generaloberst Nikolaus von Falkenhorst, demanded 145,000 prisoners of war to carry out development of the railroad to Kirkenes within four years.

The very comprehensive plan was set aside, and in the first round 30,000 POWs were brought in to carry out railroad construction from Mosjoen to Tysfjord Municipality. The Todt Organization was responsible for all road development in the occupied countries, and a sub-unit named Einsatzgruppe Wiking (the Viking Task Force) took responsibility for building the railroad between Mo i Rana and Fauske. The head of Todt Organisation for Norway was Willi Henne and the sub-division "Einsatzgruppe Wiking". The head of Einsatzgruppe Wikings road construction department, Hermann Hesse, wrote to Willi Henne, of June 1943 "that he had been informed by the construction firm Hans Röllinger KG (Fürth) that they had recently stopped the beating of Yugoslavian inmates on their road construction site in the hope that this would raise the men’s performance." Einsatzgruppe Wiking was responsible for beating and killing of POW during the road construction. Several German construction companies were involved as sub-contractors, that still exist today: Müller-Altvatter (Stuttgart), Eschweiler Tiefbau – J. Pellini (Eschweiler) and Röllinger KG (Fürth)

By the war's end, the Wehrmacht had used 140,000 POWs as slave labor in Norway. Of these, about 1,600 were Poles, 1,600 were Yugoslavs, and the majority, around 75,000, were Soviet citizens.

=== Five main camps in Northern Norway ===
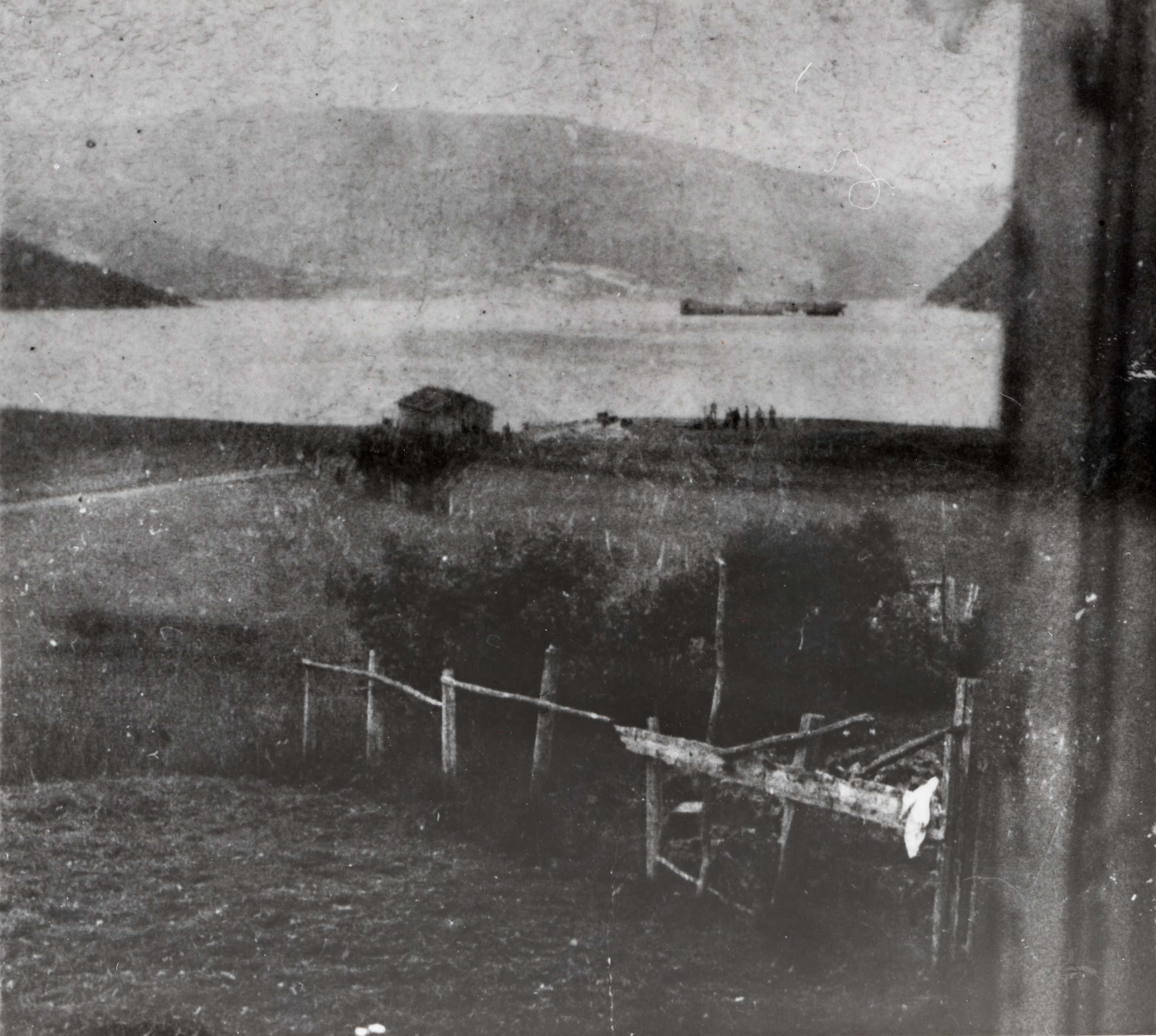
A ship arriving at Botn with POWs.

The prisoners of war were sent through central Europe to Stettin on the Baltic Sea. On the way to Norway, they were quartered at various German camps. The transport from Stettin was by ship to either Bergen or Trondheim, and then further north to the five main camps. The northernmost one was located in Karasjok Municipality, the camp at Beisfjord was the largest, the Botn camp was located in Saltdal Municipality, and in the southern part of Northern Norway were the Osen and Korgen camps. These first five camps were each referred to as a "Serb camp" (Norwegian: serberleir). However, there were many more small camps throughout Northern Norway. Between Korgen and Narvik alone there were up to 50 camps with around 30,000 prisoners.

It appears certain that here one is dealing with pure annihilation camps and that the purpose was to systematically exterminate all of the prisoners. In the face of starvation, abuse, and hard work, the prisoners' health systematically failed, after which they either died or were euthanized as useless.

— Norsk Retstidende, 1947, page 376

In the summer of 1942, about 2,500 Yugoslav prisoners of war arrived at these five camps, and by the next summer only about 750 were still alive. The differences between the camps are apparent from the fact that in the camp at Bakken further up in Saltdal no prisoners died over the span of three years.

The conditions in many of the camps were cruel. Responsibility in the camps was split up systematically, so that the individual German officer with responsibility in each camp could with a certain kind of justification declare himself not liable for the misery. The personal character of the camp commandant was decisive for the conditions in each camp.

=== Highway 50 between Rognan and Fauske ===
Road construction was to take place simultaneously with railroad construction. Highway 50 (today E6) traversing Saltfjellet was opened in 1937, but it was a low-quality road. From Rognan to Langset, a few kilometers north in Saltdal Fjord, there was a ferry. Further north in Salten there were also many longer ferry connections. In December 1941, the Germans demanded forced road construction and offered prisoners to the Directorate of Public Roads to carry out the work. It was agreed to prioritize the three road systems in Korgen, in Botn in Saltdal, and around Beisfjord in Ofoten.

The new road over Korgfjellet (no) (a mountain) in Korgen Municipality was intended to replace another ferry connection along Highway 50 between Elsfjord and Hemnesberget. On June 23, 1942, Yugoslav prisoners of war were brought to two camps: to Fagerlimoen (in Korgen) and to Osen (in Knutlia). The camps were active until the summer of 1943. A temporary bridge was set up over Beis Fjord in Ofoten in July 1943 and a ferry connection was set up between Fagernes and Ankenes. This was replaced by the Beisfjord Bridge in 1959. The Beisfjord camp was located in Beisfjord, 13 kilometers (8.1 mi) south of Narvik, and was active from June 1942 until the end of the war.

The Blood Road was a road section northeast of Rognan in Saltdal Municipality. The road was a new section of Norwegian National Road 50 between Rognan and Langset on the east side of Saltdal Fjord, where there was a ferry connection before the war. The Blood Road itself now corresponds to a section of today's European route E6 between Saltnes and Saksenvik. The prisoners that built the road belonged to the Botn camp.

The prisoners of war were generally treated poorly during the construction. They received small portions of simple food, their clothing was not suitable for winter use, and the hygiene conditions were extremely deficient with much lice infestation.

== Botn camp ==
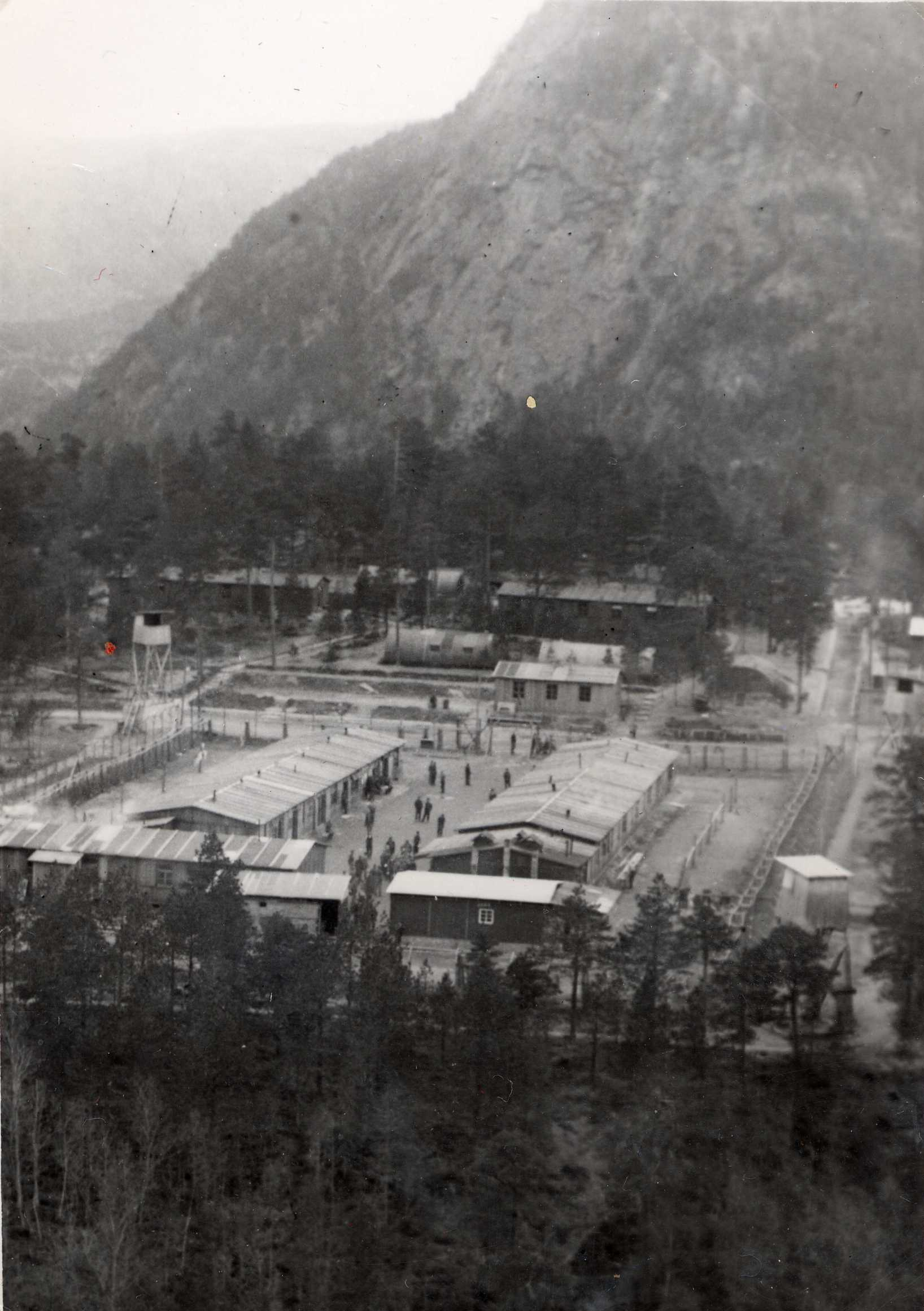
Panoramic view of the Botn camp. Today there is a Yugoslav and German wartime cemetery at the site.

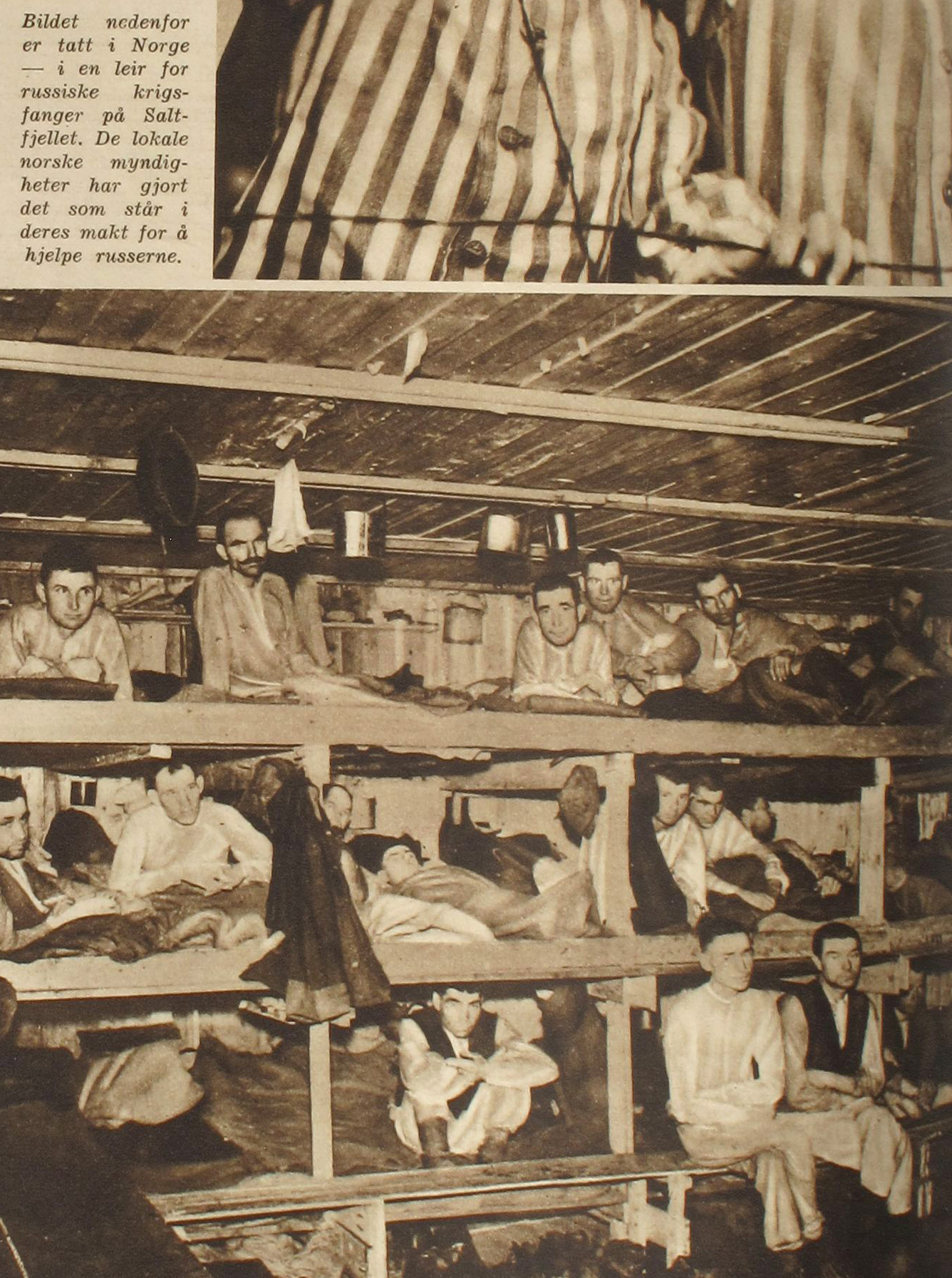
News photo in the magazine Aktuell in June 1945 from one of the camps on Saltfjellet mountain. The conditions in the Botn camp were probably similar.

The largest and best-known camp in Saltdal was in Botn near Saltdal Fjord, about 2 kilometers (1.2 mi) from Rognan. The camp was set back from the other buildings in Botn, but was still close to the work and the fjord. Around Botn there are high mountains, and the areas to the east are bare deserted mountainous terrain. Before the Blood Road was built, the little village had no road connection.

The prisoners carried out roadwork on the stretch from Rognan to Langset. Personnel from the Norwegian Public Roads Administration led the efforts technically and served as blasting foremen and facility managers.

=== Background of the prisoners ===
The prisoners of war that were used in Saltdal came from Yugoslavia and the Soviet Union, and some were also from Poland.

The majority of the prisoners from Yugoslavia were political prisoners, but the criminologist Nils Christie explains that their backgrounds varied, and so it is difficult to fully characterize them. Christie also offers some hypotheses for why it is probable that they were politically active. A portion of them were both political prisoners and Partisans, and they came from all walks of life and of all ages; the youngest were only 13 to 14 years old. The majority were Serbs, but some were also Croats.

The labor camps in Norway and in other areas conquered by the Germans were often as bad as the "Nacht und Nebel" camps, where political prisoners in particular would "disappear." Resistance movements arose in countries occupied by Nazi Germany. Executions of captured resistance member were counterproductive because they hardened public opinion. The "Nacht und Nebel" camps would keep the prisoners' relatives and other people unaware of their fate. This system was used against resistance members both in Germany and in occupied areas. In addition, the camps constituted an important economic base for the SS-dominated state. The expenses for labor were very small and the labor supply was almost unlimited.

=== Arrival at the camp ===
The Botn camp was active from July 1942 to June 1944. The camp was built by the Public Roads Administration after it had been ordered to build barracks at the beginning of June 1942. The camp was fenced by two barbed-wire fences, which were about 2 meters (6 ft 7 in) high and had a 0.5-meter (1 ft 8 in) interval between them. There were three guards at the camp. Two barracks were built with simple boarded exteriors and floors without a foundation. The barracks contains five-tiered bunk beds. Outside the camp was the barracks for the guard crew. When the guard was installed on June 20, the building was not yet finished. The commandant of the camp was Hauptsturmführer Franz Kiefer, and he was in charge of six officers and two NCOs, all members of the SS. In addition, there were ten to twelve military police and another NCO. The commandant of the Osen camp, Sturmbannführer Dolph, was also given oversight over the Botn camp and Korgen camp.

The first prisoners at the Botn camp were 472 Yugoslavs who arrived by ship on July 25, 1942. They had been brought by ship from Szczecin to Bergen on June 2. Twenty-eight of the prisoners were already shot upon arrival in Bergen. From Bergen, they were sent by ship to Botn, and 400 prisoners were sent further on to Karasjok. The Furumo farm was located about 150 meters (490 ft) from the camp, and those that lived there said that the prisoners were marched from the sea up to the camp in smaller groups, while the guards shouted at and struck them, causing many to fall over.

=== Malnutrition and pecking order ===
The two camps in Botn were so poorly built that the snow made its way into the prisoners' beds. The daily rations were very small, and a former prisoner described the food supplies as follows: Typically four or five men shared one loaf of bread, 50 men shared .5 kilograms (1.1 lb) of margarine, and 100 men shared 1 kilogram (2.2 lb) of sausages. Each man received 0.5 liters (17 U.S. fl oz) of soup a day. The labor shifts were 14 hours long. Sanitation was extremely inadequate; the prisoners fetched washing and drinking water from open ditches in the camp. Outflow from the toilets often entered the channels.

Disagreements between the Croats and Serbs were exploited by the SS guards. (Note: There were major internal conflicts in the Kingdom of Yugoslavia during World War II in which the ethnic groups opposed one another. The Kingdom of Yugoslavia was one of many small countries that pledged support for the Axis, and thus was on the German side when the war began. In this state, Croats held leading political positions but soon turned against the Serbs and formed the Independent State of Croatia.) A few selected Croats received more privileged positions as kapos. The kapo system was common in Nazi concentration camps. The kapos received more food than they could manage to eat themselves. As a result, food barter became established, in which those with more sold their soup ration and received a half ration of bread from those that had too little. A former prisoner commented in broken Norwegian on the difference between food intake by kapos and the rest of the prisoners of war: "Among these, there were several who were so fat that they weighed over 100 kilograms (220 lb), whereas the majority were under 50 kilograms (110 lb)."

=== Norwegian guards from the Hirdvaktbataljon ===
Regarding the guard battalion, I would like to ask you as soon as possible to withdraw it, and to send them to the Legion. Because the service these boys are performing is the most horrible I've ever heard of, since they are simply performing what was called "knacker service" in the Thirty Years' War for the Germans.
I have constantly heard rumors about what they're doing up there, and the other day I received confirmation from a man who came from there on leave because he came into my office and said "Heil og sæl, I am a trained killer." He told me that the Serbs they are guarding up there were sentenced to death in Serbia, but for one reason or another were brought up to Finnmark, and from there they will not escape alive; and it is these young Hird members' despairing duty to finish off each of these prisoners. From what my informant said, and from what I have also heard from others, the treatment of these men is inhuman. He claimed that in the time he has been there they have had to kill about seven hundred by shooting or hanging. That the Fører's young idealistic political soldiers should have to perform this kind of service is impossible and must be completely rejected.

— Excerpt from a letter from Hird leader Oliver Møystad to Vidkun Quisling

On August 1, 1942 about 30 Norwegian guards arrived at the camp. They were from the Hirdvaktbataljon (the Guard Battalion of the Hird) set up under the NS Ungdomsfylking (the Nasjonal Samling youth organization) in order to protect businesses from sabotage. The members of the Hirdvaktbataljon were as young as 16 and were therefore (or for other reasons) not accepted for service at the front. They were only responsible for preventing escapes and had no responsibility for managing the labor. They had "shoot-to-kill" orders in the event of an escape. They were not formally allowed to punish prisoners, but this was not adhered to. The guard crews had rifles with bayonets, and some had automatic firearms.

The young men in the Hirdvaktbataljon mistreated the prisoners by hitting and kicking them, throwing stones, striking them with their rifle butts, and stabbing them with bayonets. The younger the guards were, the more brutally they behaved. After the labor shifts, the guards would report poor performance to the camp management. Those accused of lack of effort were punished with 25 strokes of a cane, sometimes up to 50. The prisoners that were beaten frequently rarely lived long.

A man living near the Botn camp stated: "I remember that among the Norwegian guards there was a very good man, who helped the prisoners with news and food, and who did not force them to work. But the Germans found out, and he suddenly vanished."

After the war, it was also ascertained that the young men's behavior in the camp had also shocked the highest levels of Nasjonal Samling. In a private letter (see excerpt at right), Vidkun Quisling was urged to transfer the youths away from this service.

=== Commandant at the Botn camp ===
SS Hauptsturmführer Franz Kiefer, who was the commandant at the Botn camp, was an exceptionally brutal man according to all witnesses. A young man from the Hirdvaktbataljon stated in an interview with Christie: "The Germans up there were insane. Kiefer was a devil like no other. He put his fist up in our faces when we arrived. We had to obey orders, otherwise we would be hanged immediately. Fifteen- and sixteen-year-olds lived only as long as they thought things were the way they should be."

Another witness from the Hirdvaktbataljon stated: "We were so shocked that we didn't understand anything. It was snowing and cold, sad and rugged. Pigsties. The prisoners milled around and scowled, aware that something was amiss. The Germans behaved shockingly. The camp commandant Kiefer came directly from an insane asylum in Germany. He walked around with a little whip that he used to beat us and others. I myself was struck in the face by him. When he was drunk he was completely out of control. 'Why didn't you take off?' people asked afterwards. I didn't know where I was, only the general direction, and around us there were snow, ice, and mountains everywhere." Christie notes that Kiefer certainly did not come from an insane asylum, but it is interesting as a characterization.

Kiefer had a hammer forged with a spike on it that he used to mistreat the prisoners. A witness stated that he would swing his short hammer around furiously.

=== Norwegian guards from the SS Guard Battalion ===
After four to five months, the first Norwegian guard crew was relieved by 180 men from the SS Guard Battalion (no) (German: SS-Wachbataillon Norwegen). Many of the SS Guard Battalion guards were as brutal as those from the Hirdvaktbataljon, yet there were now a greater number that treated prisoners in a fairly orderly manner.

=== Escape attempts ===
The first escape attempt from the camp occurred on December 14, 1942 and was carried out by Tihomir Pantović (a.k.a. "Yellow"). The escape was something that the prisoners had agreed to among themselves. The plan was for the escapee to make his way to Sweden and tell about the conditions so that the outside world would become aware of what was going on. The prisoner that escaped was intercepted by Norwegian guards; when he understood that the attempt was unsuccessful he tried desperately to cut his throat with a lens from his glasses. The two Norwegian guards mistreated him so brutally that they kicked out one of his eyes and broke an arm. He was brought back to the camp, where he was kept for three days without food or water. Then he was hanged in front of everyone. Those that took him down said he was bruised all over his body from punches and kicks.

The next and last escape attempt that was made when the SS-Vaktbataljon was in charge of the camp was carried out by Svetislav Nedeljković (a.k.a. "Crazy Sveta"). This occurred on February 12, 1943 and was also unsuccessful. After it became known that a prisoner had escaped, extensive searches were carried out in all houses and buildings in Botn. The civilian population was interrogated and accused of hiding the fugitive.

After the Wehrmacht took over guard duties, Cveja Jovanović was one of the prisoners who managed to escape to Sweden. His book Flukt til friheten (Escape to Freedom) was published in Norwegian in 1985. The book describes his escape and also presents other escape attempts that were made from camps in Norway. Jovanović describes in detail the risk that the escapees exposed themselves to, and what reprisals their fellow prisoners could expect. The circumstances and the dangers in escaping from the Botn camp and other camps in Salten are also thoroughly discussed.

About 30 prisoners managed to escape from the camps in Saltdal in the course of three years. Jovanović says that 23 men escaped from the Botn camp, but he does not mention how many of those were successful.

=== Mass executions ===
The first mass executions at the Botn camp happened in late November 1942, right after the new group with Norwegian guard crews had arrived. One of these stated what happened: "A pit was dug about 200 meters (660 ft) from the camp and the Serbian prisoners were gathered around it. The pit was 30 meters (98 ft) long, 2.5 meters (8 ft 2 in) wide, and 2 meters (6 ft 7 in) deep. Three Norwegian guards were ordered to stand watch around the group of prisoners, while the SS guards methodically shot them in the back of the head. When I came out, the Germans had already started the executions, and a boy age 13 was next in line. The boy fell down on his knees and begged for his life, but he was shot in the back of the head and fell into the grave."

The prisoners were lined up on the edge of the grave, so that they fell right into it after the shot was fired. They were shot in groups of ten, which were lined up at the edge in turns. The Norwegian guard walked to the grave and saw that several were still alive. He lost control and shouted, "But they're still alive!" He was immediately threatened with a gun by one of the SS guards and taken away from the execution site. When he talked about this at the barracks, the other guards said that he was soft.

A prisoner who buried the bodies told the Norwegian guard that around 77 prisoners were shot, and that their ages ranged from around 12 to 70 years. The corpses lay at one end of the grave. They were covered with only a thin layer of soil because more new prisoners were buried every day. The German SS guards said that the detainees were ill and were being executed to avoid infection. The Norwegian guard himself thought that the reason was that they were so starved that they had no strength to work.

According to the Yugoslav War Crimes Commission, this execution occurred on November 26, 1942 and 73 prisoners were shot. The shooting was ordered by Untersturmführer August Riemer. The next mass execution of sick prisoners took place in January 1943. The War Crimes Commission established that 50 people were executed on this occasion and the date was determined to be 23 January. Norwegian guards were present at the event, but reportedly only German crews carried out the executions.

=== Local population ===
The local people could not fail to be aware of the conditions in the camps. Although there was no abundance of food in Norwegian homes during the war, some food was given to the prisoners, especially those that lived near the camps gave as often as they could and recognized "kind" guards that openly permitted the prisoners to receive food. However, most often food was given by hiding it at construction sites or along the roads. Helping the prisoners could be dangerous because of reprisals. Julie Johansen lived near the Botn camp and became known as the "Yugoslavs' mother"; for her efforts she received an award from Josip Broz Tito after the war.

In the course of three years, around 30 prisoners managed to escape from the camps in Saltdal and make their way to Sweden. The locals significantly assisted the escaped prisoners by guiding them on their way and helping with shelter, food, and equipment. Some Saltdal residents worked as border guides and the escape route usually went to the Swedish mountain farm of Mavas via Mount Salt. During the winter, this was a daunting journey and on the Swedish side many miles still remained to reach civilization. The fugitives thus also depended on help from Swedes.

There was also an escape route across the Sulitjelma massif somewhat further north. Some employees of the Sulitjelma Mines who lived in the small mining community of Jakobsbakken were a known group of border guides. When they took people into the mountains and were gone a few days, this was not registered as an absence and they were paid as though they had been at work. Before coming to the mountain village of Sulitjelma, there is the village of Lakså near Upper Lake (Norwegian: Øvervatnet), where there were border guides for a slightly more northerly route. In Salten there were organized border guides, couriers, intelligence agents, and resisters making it possible for these escape routes to function.

The most frequently used border guide in Saltdal was probably Peter Båtskar. He lived in a hut in the mountains south of Rognan, subsisted mostly on hunting and fishing, and was viewed as an odd character. He was recommended to fugitives who came from the prison camps. Among the people in Saltdal, it became an adage to say: "Send him to Båtskar!" when someone was in a difficult situation.

== Transfer of guard duties to the Wehrmacht ==
Conditions at the camp improved when the Wehrmacht took charge at Easter 1943. Of the 472 prisoners who had arrived the camp, at least 302 had died. Thus, there were 170 prisoners in the camp when the Wehrmacht took over. On April 12, a new group of 300 prisoners arrived at the camp, including the then 20-year-old Ostoja Kovačević, who wrote the book En times frihet (One Hour of Freedom). The first Sunday that he was in camp, all of the new prisoners had to wash themselves outside in a small lake where ice was still floating. The German soldiers beat the prisoners and forced them into the water.

Kovačević says that such bathing Sundays were something that happened often: "Bathing Sundays always ended with large and small tragedies. Many were so frozen stiff that they could not manage to get their clothes on, and so others had to dress them. It often happened that almost half of the prisoners had to be carried back to camp after bathing. And the Gypsies that had managed to resist both starvation and beatings were broken here. One after another, they had to be carried unconscious back to the camp, where they later died." A German non-commissioned officer had previously served as an orderly; he used to treat frostbite by chopping off frozen fingers with his bayonet.

=== Cross of blood on rock wall facing Highway 50 ===
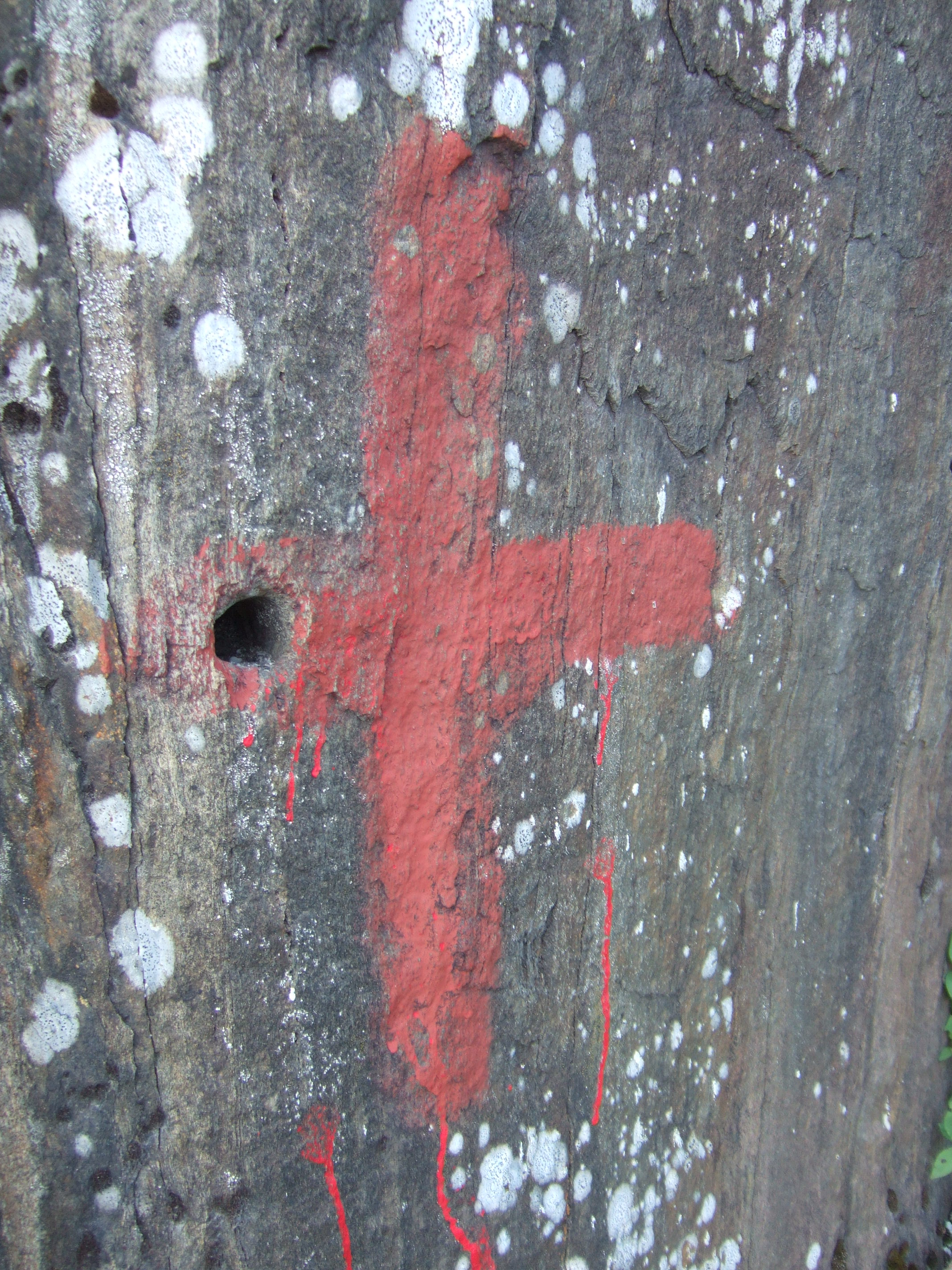
The blood cross was originally painted with the blood of Miloš Banjac after he was shot and killed. Today the cross is regularly repainted.

On July 14, 1943 Miloš Banjac (from village Klekovci, Kozarska Dubica) was shot by a Wehrmacht guard Ćoro, and his brother Marijan stretched a cross on the rock wall next to him with the dead man's blood. It is the unique monument in the world with the Biblical motive. Simo Brdar directed and recorded a film "Cross of Blood" that was screened in Oslo Holocaust Center in 2017. This event resulted in the stretch of road between Rognan and Saksenvik on the east side of Saltdal Fjord being known as the Blood Road (Norwegian: Blodveien). The cross is still marked today.

=== Improved conditions ===
A Yugoslav doctor and major who arrived in October 1943 described the conditions in the camp on his arrival: "There were over 400 Yugoslav prisoners, a very motley crew, some former gendarmes from the Yugoslav police, some teachers and intellectuals, but essentially people that had fought as irregulars in Yugoslavia. A number of these were communists. Fifty percent of the prisoners could hardly walk, so weakened were they by hunger and disease. A number of them had scabies. About 40 patients lay in a hospital barracks, of whom 15 had tuberculosis in a very advanced stage; other patients lay with untreated leg fractures and one with a jaw fracture. All medical care was provided by a young Yugoslav medical student, but there were almost no drugs or instruments of any kind."

The doctor quickly came into conflict with the camp commandant, who was a captain in the Wehrmacht. He tried to stop the Sunday bathing, but with no success. He dared to report sick prisoners despite the fact that the commandant thought that he was sabotaging the road construction efforts. There was a camp inspection at the Botn camp, and the doctor submitted his complaints. Some time later the commandant was replaced, after which inspections were more frequent and were performed by senior German officers. In one instance a general from Oslo also came for an inspection. After the last inspection, corporal punishment was prohibited and the rations were increased. Medicines and medical instruments were also sent to the camp. A German doctor came for an inspection and all of the prisoners were examined; all of those who were seriously ill were sent south. After the Yugoslav doctor came to the camp, only four or five prisoners died.

=== Red Cross inspection ===
In January 1944, a Red Cross commission arrived at the Botn camp. This may have been connected with Kovačević's escape to Sweden, because there the fugitive had informed the outside world and the Red Cross about the conditions. After this, all of the prisoners were registered by the Red Cross, and they were able to receive and send mail. In spring 1944, the prisoners received official status as prisoners of war, and on June 1 all of the prisoners were sent to a camp at the Lillealmenningen farm (also known as the Potthus camp) a little further south in Saltdal. Prisoners from the Korgen camp were also transferred there. Later the prisoners were sent to a new camp on Mount Salt called the Polar Circle Camp (German: Lager Polarcirkel).

== Other camps in Saltdal ==
There were as many as 18 camps in Saltdal during the Second World War. The prisoners worked on both road and railway construction, and, as mentioned, the conditions in the other camps in Saltdal were generally significantly better.

== Shutdown and repatriation ==
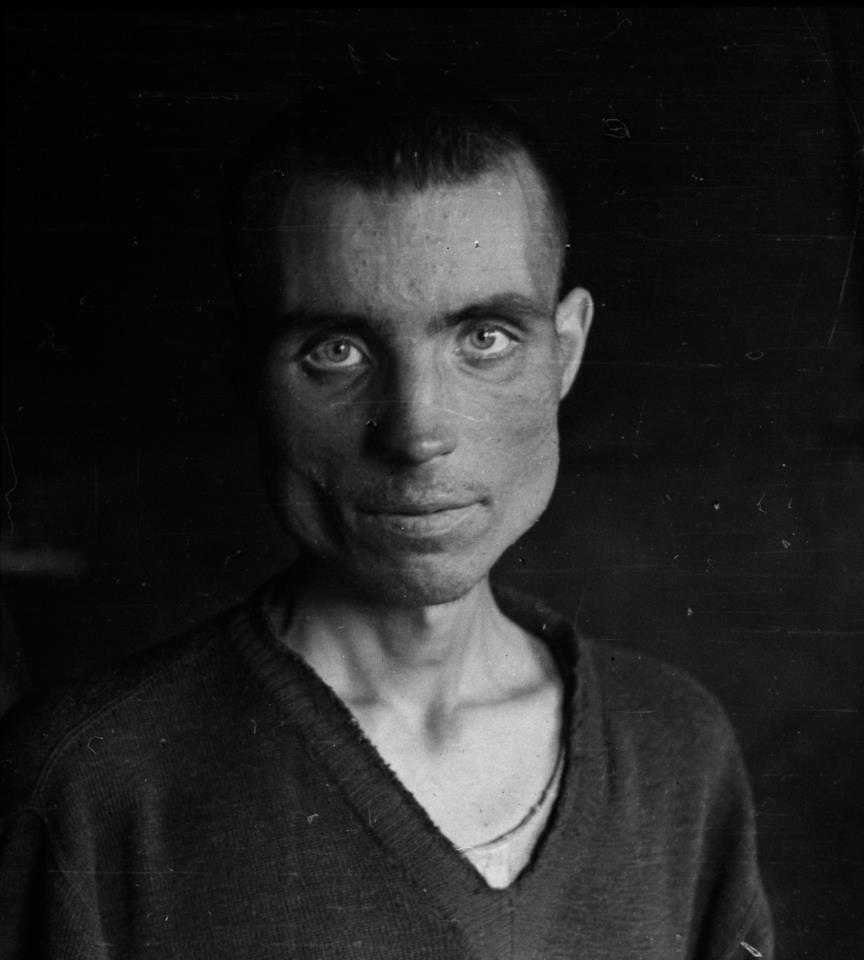
Freed Russian prisoner of war from the Bjørnelva camp in Saltdal, 1945

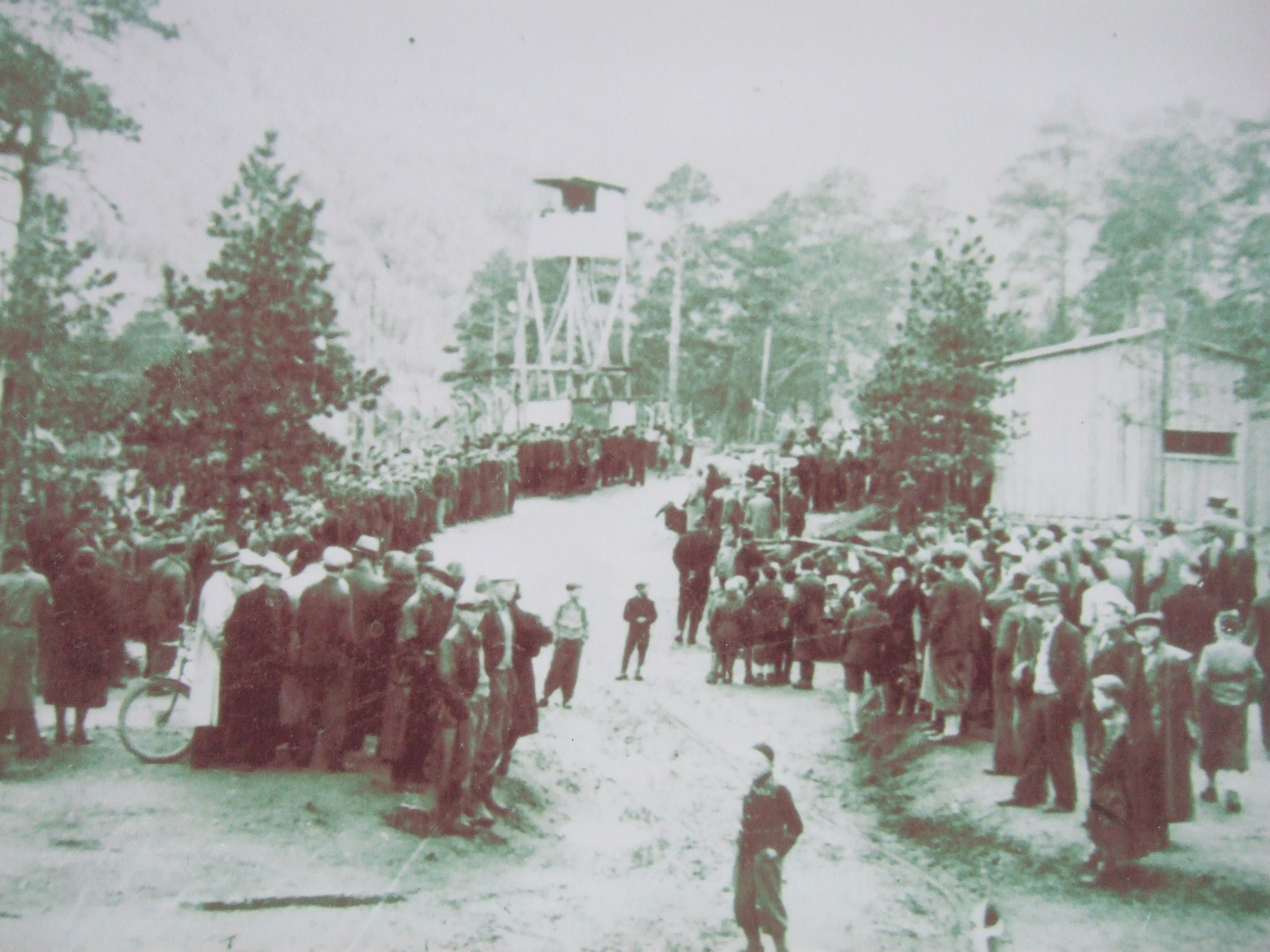
The prison camp in Botn was shut down in spring 1945. Villagers appeared to see the camp opened up and shut down. In its last year, the camp was filled with Soviet prisoners of war.

A review conducted by Chief Physician Simon Frostad (1903–1984) showed that there were a total of 7,465 prisoners of war in Saltdal as of May 14, 1945. This figure is a minimum. The large number of prisoners represented more than a doubling of the population in the municipality. When the camps were shut down, many needed rehabilitation, and their repatriation also took time. After three months, all of the camps were empty.

The sources give different accounts of the number of prisoners in total in the Botn camp. Cveja Jovanović specifies some figures in his book; namely, that 463 prisoners came to the camp on 25 July 1942. Of these, 276 died in April 1943. On April 11 the same year, a further 400 Partisan prisoners were transferred to Botn. Later that month, the Wehrmacht took over the guard duties, and under their direction a total of 18 were shot, 60 died of other causes, and 23 managed to escape. Later, 105 people were sent to the medical camp at Øysand in Trondheim. On June 1, 1944 the Boten camp was shut down and all of the remaining 381 prisoners were sent to the Potthus camp a little further south in Saltdal. These figures differ from those cited in other sources (the primary source is testimony by witnesses), but they give an idea of the magnitude.

The Russian prisoners who were released were either executed upon arrival in Murmansk, or were sent to NKVD filtration camps because, under the Soviet penal code, they were under suspicion for having allowed themselves to be taken prisoner.

== Trials ==
Nils Parelius (1912–1995) was the district attorney in Møre og Romsdal, and in 1945 he was an assistant judge in Salten. He was also a local historian, and he wrote an article about the Botn camp in the magazine Samtiden, later republished in his book Tilintetgjørelsesleirene for jugoslaviske fanger i Nord-Norge (Extermination Camps for Yugoslav Prisoners in Northern Norway) in 1984. The article provides a broad overview of what happened in connection with the Blood Road and the postwar trials.

=== Trial in Belgrade ===
Thirty-two guards from the Yugoslav camps in Norway were tried by a military court in Belgrade in the fall of 1946. The witnesses were former prisoners. Statements given by Norwegian eyewitnesses and recorded by the British War Crimes Commission in Norway were also submitted. The case went to the Supreme Military Court, which ruled on December 1, 1946. Death sentences were handed down to 22 guards, and prison sentences ranging from 5 to 20 years for the others. Among those sentenced to death, 17 had served in the original five camps in Northern Norway. Five of those sentenced to death were SS officers from the Botn camp, including Untersturmführer August Riemer. He was sentenced for both of the mass executions, in November 1942 and January 1943.

The archives at the Falstad Center contain details of what later happened with those responsible from Botn camp and other camps in Norway. This information was collected and translated by the former Yugoslav prisoner Petar Krasulja from Belgrade, and the letter containing this information is dated June 13, 2000. The following were sentenced to death by firing squad: Franz Kiefer, the aforementioned August Riemer, Kurt Bretschneider, and Richard Hager, all of them SS members.

=== Trials in Norway ===
==== Sentencing ====
In Norway, investigation of the conditions at the Botn camp began in the summer of 1947.

500 Norwegian guards served at four main camps—Lager 1 Beisfjord, Lager 2 Elsfjord, Lager 3 Rognan and Lager 4 Karasjok—and their satellite prison camps at Korgen, Osen, and at Lake Jernvann on Bjørnfjell. (Those guards came from Hirdvaktbataljonen—a battalion within Hirden, that had the responsibility for guarding the prison camps in North Norway, between June 1942 and April 1943; members of the battalion participated in Norway's largest massacre.)

It had been thought that 363 Norwegians participated as guards in Norwegian camps. Norwegian criminologist Nils Christie found 249 names, more than the official investigation tracked down.

A death sentence was handed down by the Eidsivating Court of Appeal against a former guard at the Botn camp. He was found guilty of the murder of one prisoner, as well as abuse. The verdict was appealed to the Supreme Court of Norway, but the case was thrown out. Later proceedings on the case led to the sentence being commuted to 14 years of forced labor. Another case that resulted in the death penalty was also heard at the Eidsivating Court of Appeal. It dealt with the murder of four prisoners at the Korgen camp. The Supreme Court also unanimously upheld the death sentence. The defendants were later pardoned.

The Hålogaland Court of Appeal dealt with most of the cases. Twenty-one guards were sentenced for a total of 25 deaths, six were indicted for having taken part in executions, 29 were sentenced for abuse, and some were sentenced for their general participation in guard duties. Presentation of evidence was difficult. Most of the witnesses were dead or could not be found, and the defendants themselves were witnesses. The time that had passed was a further difficulty, and many charges were dropped. Four received life sentences with forced labor, two received 20 years in prison, and the others received sentences of between 6½ and 17 years in prison.

==== Perspectives on sentencing ====
There were different perspectives on how the sentencing should be viewed. Parelius says that the sentences took into account both the defendant's personality and his actions themselves. Two fundamental perspectives can be applied when sentencing; one perspective emerged in an appeal declaration in a murder case from the Botn camp, where the defender contended: "The prison camp was an extermination camp where killings and deaths, so to say, were part of the daily routine. Consequently, the importance of a prisoner's life was not particularly great, and the notions of dignity and respect for human life that normally would have manifested themselves and provided a reason for the legal strict injunction against taking life lost their relative weight. Killing was therefore not carried out by such a criminal mind as would generally be the case with killing committed under normal circumstances. The prosecution must make allowance for this as a mitigating factor in the sentencing."

In the Supreme Court, the second perspective on sentencing was given decisive importance. One judge. Reidar Skau, stated in one of the cases against the guards: "This defendant's crime is not just a murder committed under especially aggravating circumstances, but it is in fact also a war crime—a crime against the 'laws of humanity.' International law sets strict rules for the treatment of prisoners during war and recognizes the application of the strictest punishment for crimes against them. Prisoners during a war—be they military or civilian—are in a particularly vulnerable position and have no other guardian than that which strong legal protection can provide. Strong legal protection under circumstances such as these requires not only strict legal rules, but also strict enforcement of them."

==== Nils Christie's investigations ====
Criminalist Nils Christie was a student in 1950 and was assigned to find out what had happened regarding the Yugoslav prisoners in Norway. In Professor Johannes Andenæs's office, Director General of Public Prosecutions Andreas Aulie told Christie that "There's something horrible we want to know more about." Christie's work also constituted his 1952 thesis in sociology, Fangevoktere i konsentrasjonsleire (Concentration Camp Guards). The work attracted little attention at the time, and it was many years before the public took any interest in the matter. The report was published in book form in 1972 by Pax Forlag, and was reissued in 2010 in connection with winning the Norwegian Sociology Canon award. The report provides a detailed description of the conditions in the camps, but it is primarily a sociological survey of the Norwegians who worked there. During the legal purge in Norway after World War II, not much public attention was devoted to the conditions in prisoner-of-war camps.

The information sources for the events were prisoners, guards, people living near the camps, and other eyewitnesses. Christie's report takes into account documents from the 1930s and 1940s up to some extensive litigation after the war. Some of the circumstances remain unclear; at the trials, it was only possible to engage a few of the survivors. Language differences were an additional difficulty. Obtaining witness statements from the Norwegian civilian population was also not so simple because the camps were often far from settlements.

== Aftermath ==
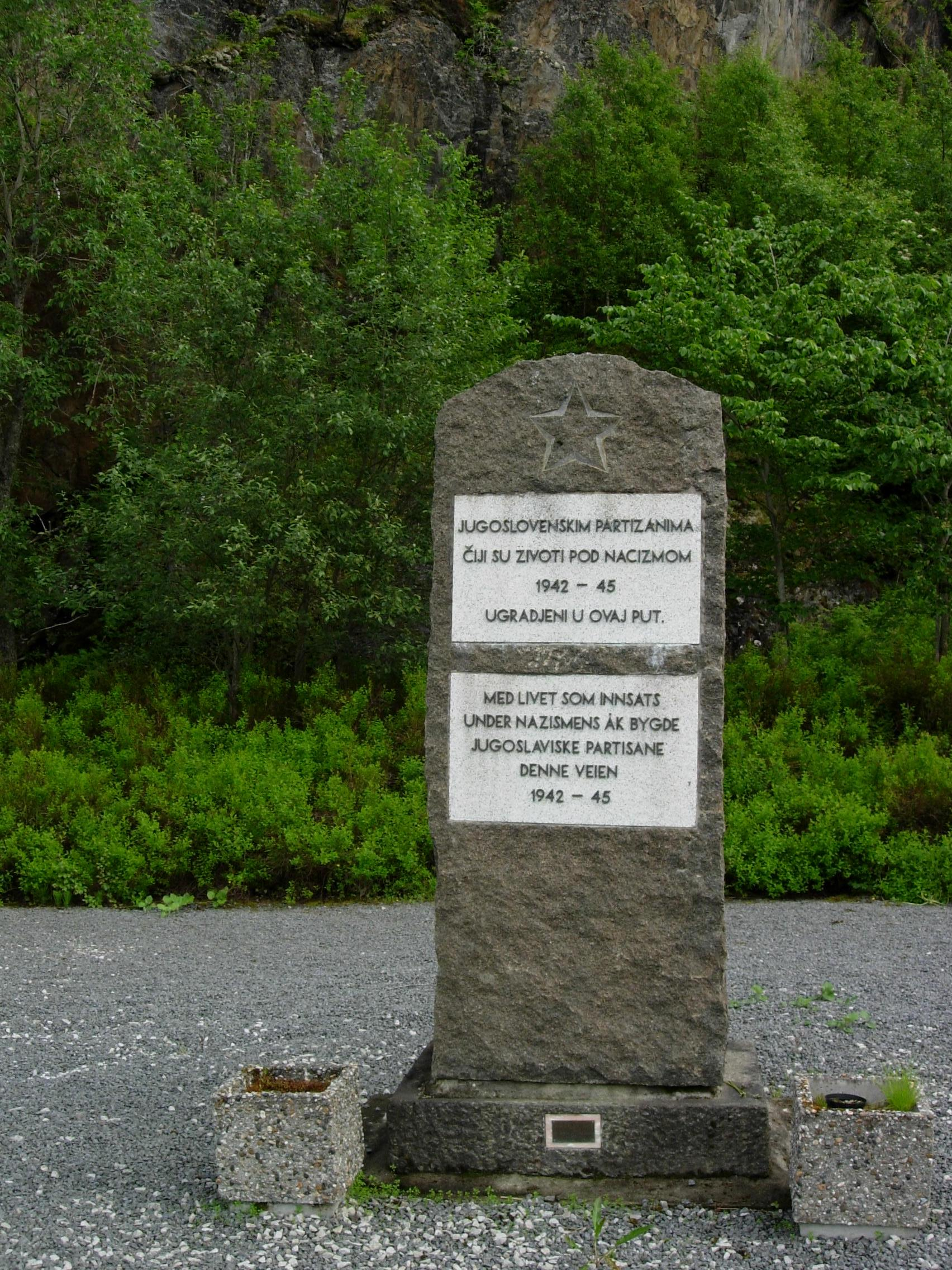
Monument to the prisoners of war that built the Blood Road close to today's European route E6.

After the war, there was little focus on the events during the construction of the Blood Road. In an interview in the newspaper Aftenposten on November 16, 2012, Christie said, "In the years following the war and occupation, it was painful and difficult to accept the fact that Norwegians could, and can, perform horrific acts like this."

After the liberation, 356 bodies of Yugoslav prisoners from the Botn camp were found. A war cemetery was created for those in Botn with 1,657 dead, of which 1,027 are unknown prisoners of war. In September 1954, a memorial was unveiled; a delegation from Yugoslavia was present at the ceremony, including three former prisoners. Norwegian authorities were also present, including Major General Arne Dagfin Dahl. Close to the Yugoslav cemetery there is also a large cemetery for German soldiers.

After the Second World War, some prisoners wrote books about their experiences at the Botn camp. In 1959, Ostoja Kovačević wrote En times frihet (One Hour of Freedom) with a foreword by Sigurd Evensmo. Later, in 1984, Cveja Jovanović wrote the book Bekstva u slobodu: iz nacističkih logora smrti u Norveškoj (Escape to Freedom: From Nazi Death Camps in Norway). In it he describes several camps in Norway during the Second World War, as well as escape attempts that were made.

The film Blodveien is based on events from the Korgen camp, but its name is taken from the stretch of road at Rognan.

Today there are several memorials in Saltdal connected with the Blood Road and other events during the Second World War. There is also a Blood Road Museum in Saltdal documenting the events.

== In popular culture ==
- The 2012 novel Svart frost (Black Frost) by Asbjørn Jaklin (no) has the Blood Road as a backdrop.

== Literature ==
- 1984 Cveja Jovanović. Bekstva u slobodu: iz nacističkih logora smrti u Norveškoj (Escape to Freedom: From Nazi Death Camps in Norway)
  - 1985 Norwegian translation: Flukt til friheten – Fra nazi-dødsleire i Norge
- Odd Sotrteig. "The Road of Blood" in Saltdal". // The history of Prosoners of war. Bodø 2006. ISBN 8291138826
