= Rognan Airfield =

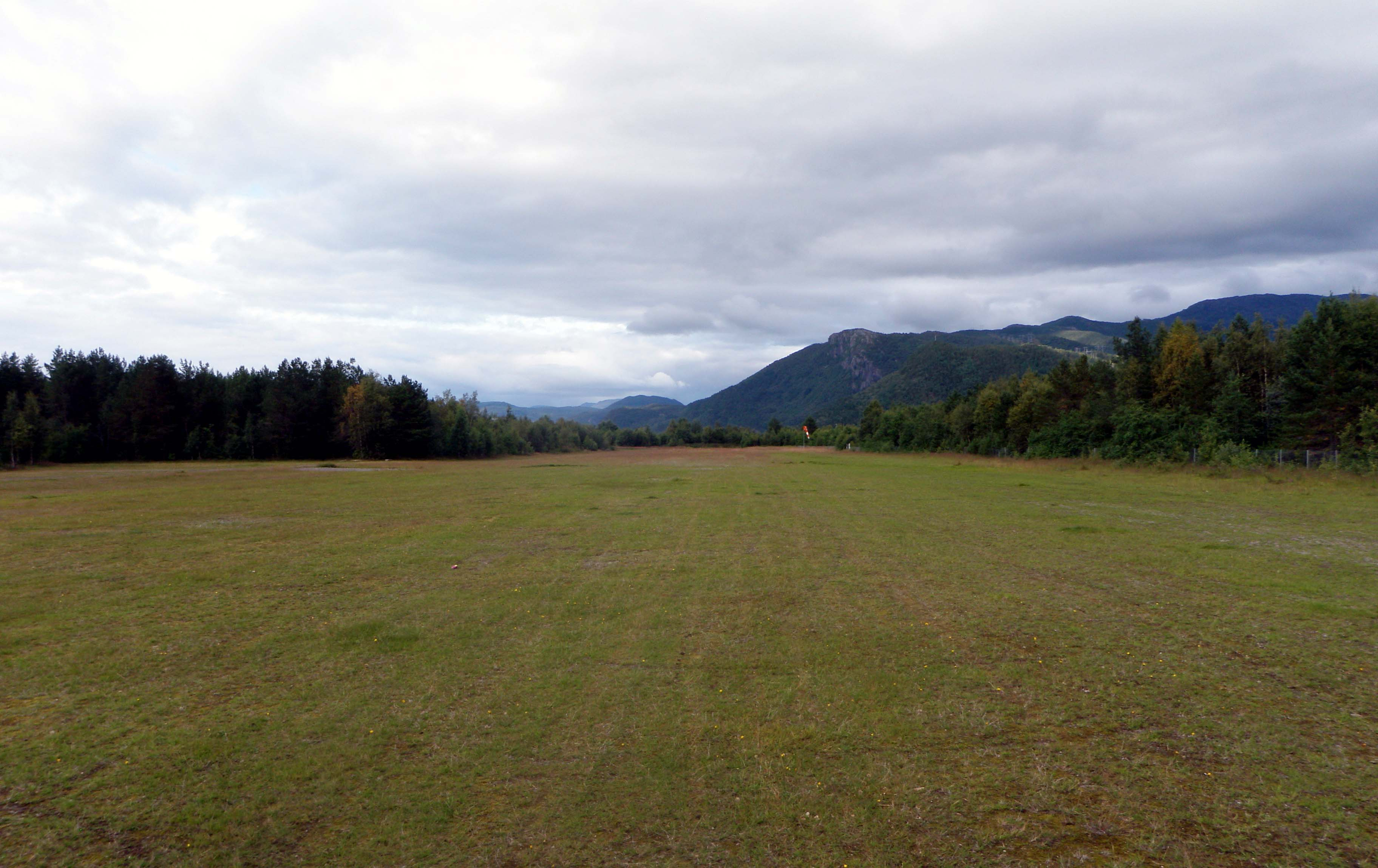
- North view of the runway at Rognan Airfield
- IATA: none; ICAO: ENRG

Summary
- Airport type: Private
- Owner: Saltdal Municipality
- Operator: Saltdal Flyklubb
- Location: Rognan, Saltdal Municipality, Norway
- Elevation AMSL: 5 m / 15 ft
- Coordinates: 67.0977°N 015.4110°E

Map
- Location in Norway

Runways
Direction	Length		Surface
Direction	m	ft	Surface
01/19	735	2,411	Grass

Rognan Airfield (Norwegian: Rognan flyplass, ICAO: ENRG) is a private aerodrome situated in the village of Rognan in Saltdal Municipality in Nordland county, Norway. The municipal airfield features a 735-meter (2,411 ft) grass runway aligned 01/19. It is used for recreational flying and is operated by Saltdal Flyklubb.

The aerodrome was built by Luftwaffe during the Second World War. Construction began in 1941 and the field opened the following year, featuring a 1,200-meter (3,900 ft) wood and concrete runway. It served mostly as a reserve airfield for Bodø Air Station. Rognan was abandoned as a military airbase after the end of the war.

== History ==
An aerodrome in Rognan was first considered by the Royal Air Force during the Norwegian Campaign in May 1940, although the plans were never carried through. Instead, construction was carried out by Luftwaffe. Preliminary work started in late 1941 and the aerodrome was completed the following year. It received a runway measuring 1,200 by 60 meters (3,940 by 200 ft), with a combined wooden and concrete surface. However, the Luftwaffe made little use of the airfield, retaining it mostly as a reserve airport for Bodø Air Station. For a period, a squadron of Junkers Ju 52 transporters were stationed at Rognan.

After the war, the airfield was taken over by the municipality and used for general aviation. A contributing factor has been the high load on Bodø Airport, which has caused restrictions on use by recreational aircraft. Sailplane activities were particularly allocated to Rognan. Saltdal Flyklubb was established as a local aviation club in 1993. It took over the responsibility for operating the aerodrome, although it remained owned by the municipality.

== Facilities ==
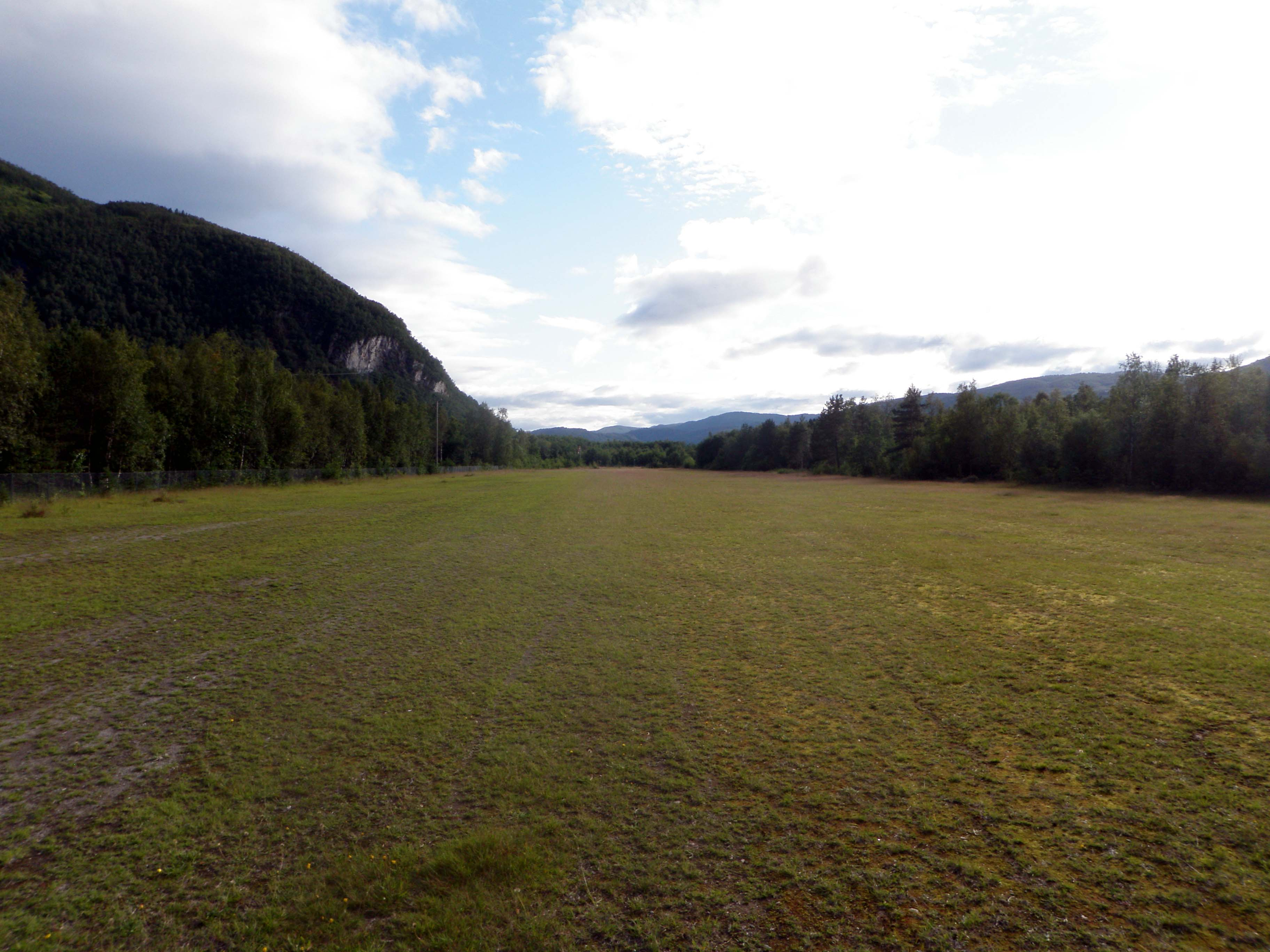
South view of the airfield's runway

Rognan Airfield is located in the village of Rognan, west of population center. It is situated north and west of the river Saltelva and the Nordland Line. The airport consists of a grass runway measuring 735 by 50 meters (2,411 by 164 ft). It is aligned 01/19, roughly north–south. The aerodrome is owned by Saltdal Municipality and operated by Saltdal Flyklubb, the sole regular operator at the field. It has a reference altitude of 5 meters (16 ft) above mean sea level.

During the Second World War the airfield consisted of a runway measuring 1,200 by 60 meters (3,940 by 200 ft). The offices, barracks and communications centre were located in the village, southwest of the runway. There were two defensive 20 mm gun positions. Organizationally, Rognan Airfield was subordinate to Bodø Air Station.

== Bibliography ==
- Hafsten, Bjørn; Larsstuvold, Ulf; Olsen, Bjørn; Stenersen, Sten (1991). Flyalarm: Luftkrigen over Norge 1939–1945 (in Norwegian). Oslo: Sem & Stenersen. ISBN 82-7046-058-3.
