= Beisfjord massacre =

1942 mass murder in Beisfjord, Norway

Coordinates: 68.3750°N 17.5997°E

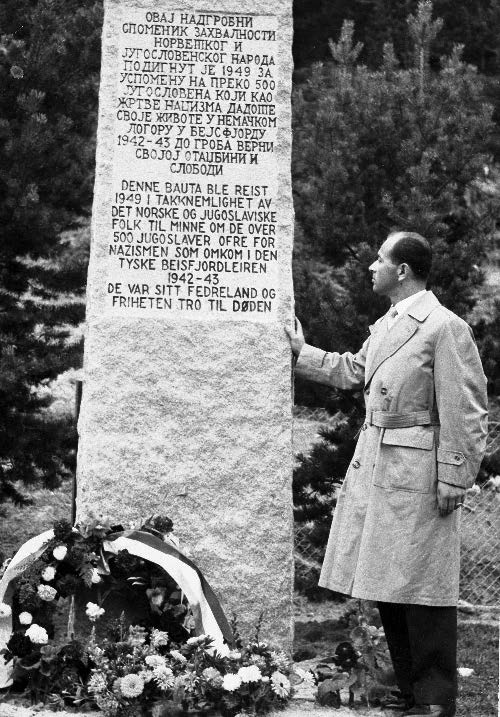
Yugoslav survivor at the Beisfjord memorial. Below the Serbian text, Norwegian is inscribed: "This monolith was erected in 1949 in gratitude, by the populaces of Norway and Yugoslavia, in memory of the more than 500 Yugoslavs – victims of Nazism that died in the German Beisfjord camp – 1942–43 – They were faithful to their fatherland and liberty – until death"

The Beisfjord massacre (Norwegian: Beisfjord-massakren) was a massacre on 18 July 1942 at Beisfjord Camp No. 1 (German: Lager I Beisfjord; Norwegian: Beisfjord fangeleir) in the village of Beisfjord in Narvik Municipality, Norway of 288 political prisoners. The massacre had been ordered a few days earlier by Josef Terboven, the Reichskommissar for Nazi-occupied Norway.

== Background ==
In order to build defences in Norway against the Allies, the Germans brought in around 5,000 Yugoslavian political prisoners and prisoners-of-war—in addition to prisoners of other nationalities—to work as forced labour on infrastructure projects. In the summer of 1942 a number of prisoners started arriving in North Norway as a result of the transfer of prisoners from the new Croatian puppet regime to German authorities who needed manpower for projects in Norway.

In 2013 Dagbladet quoted Knut Flovik Thoresen saying—in regards to the camps that were to cost the lives of 2,368 Yugoslavs—that "Norwegian [camp] guards' [in North Norway] gruesome violations against Yugoslav prisoners in Norway during the war, were so cruel that I have hardly ever read about more brutal acts". Furthermore, many of the victims were Serbs from the independent state of Croatia (NDH)—not partisans, but chosen based on ethnicity. In the first deployment of camp guards that were sent to North Norway, some used their bayonets so often "that even the Germans had enough of it". The second group were not issued bayonets, for fear that they would become as bloodthirsty. (The guards from these groups came from Hirdvaktbataljonen—a battalion within Hirden, that had the responsibility for guarding the prison camps in North Norway, between June 1942 and April 1943. 500 of these guards served at four main camps—Lager 1 Beisfjord, Lager 2 Elsfjord, Lager 3 Rognan and Lager 4 Karasjok—and their satellite prison camps at Korgen, Osen, and at Lake Jernvann on Bjørnfjell.)

The number of individuals victimized by SS-kommandant Hermann Dolp and his German and Norwegian subordinates, might total 3,000 or even 4,000.

In 2013, Flovik Thoresen said, "You can be sure that if Norwegian prisoners had been exposed to similar [atrocities], then many of the perpetrators would have been sentenced to death. Instead most were let off with sentences more lenient than those received by women who served as nurses at the front lines".

There were 31 camps between Bergen and Hammerfest during World War II. "[F]rom June 1942 until March 1943, regularly there were such executions of Yugoslavs [as at Beisfjord and Bjørnfjell ] in Norwegian camps. 27 prisoners were shot at Ulven near Bergen, and 26 were shot in Tromsø during a ship's arrival. In both cases, the prisoners were told that the sick were going to hospital. In the Karaskjok camp, [and] in Botn, in Korgen and in the Osen camps, groups of 10 to 50 sick prisoners were removed from the camps and shot. The SS cleaned out the infirmaries in this manner", according to the Norwegian Center for Studies of Holocaust and Religious Minorities.

The involvement of the Norwegian Public Roads Administration was revealed in a 2014 Dagsavisen article: "The camps were built by the Public Roads Administration." Furthermore, that the road work was led by the Public Roads Administration, "was more the rule, rather than the exception," and the agency's "employees were facilitators and witnesses—not executioners". In November 1941 blueprints and descriptions for the construction of the prison camps were sent from the Directorate of Public Roads. Furthermore, in the "early stage, we only know of one small protest: the [agency] refused to feed the prisoners. This was done by a lie": The agency claimed that it was not common for the agency to feed their road workers. Furthermore, Anders Fagerbakk's dissertation says that Helgeland veikontor—a local office of the agency—sent a letter of complaint to Directorate of Public Roads, a few days after Yugoslavs were put to work on road construction: The engineer in charge reported that "Norwegian road workers became restless and nervous, as a result of working with the Yugoslavs. The Yugoslavs were being fed starvation rations, and they lacked [enough] clothing". In later reporting from the village of Karasjok, the description "skin and bones" was used about Yugoslavian prisoners constructing roads. Furthermore, "after the war, everyone in the Public Roads Administration denied involvement with the Yugoslavian prisoners." Reactions to the involvement of the agency, include (in 2014) "Still, no one has asked: Could they have stopped the mass murders?"

"That the Public Roads Administration were early out to accept the use POWs on the agency's construction projects, opened for others—such as the State Railways—to flag their interest for this controversial manpower", according to a 2015 Klassekampen article.

"As many as 150 000 foreign POWs, political prisoners and forced laborers were in Norway between 1941 and 1945. Over 13 700 died. The majority performed heavy labour construction work on Nordland Line, Highway 50 ([present-day] E6 ) thru North Norway, fortifications and airports." The largest group of prisoners were Soviets, followed by Poles and Yugoslavs. The Yugoslavs worked on the following roads: the "Blood Road—Blodveien—from Rognan to Langsølet, Elsfjord—Korgen, on the Bjørnefjell Road towards Kiruna and on the road between Karasjok and the Finnish Border". "The Germans prioritized access to iron ore mines in Kiruna and the nickel mines in Petsamo", rather than following plans of the NPRA.

== The massacre ==
On 24 June 1942, 900 Yugoslav prisoners arrived at the Fagernes Pier in Narvik. "They start to walk the ten kilometer long road to Beisfjord" (...) Five prisoners are hit, and die along the road, and one is shot and killed" before the prisoners arrive at the location where a prison camp was established.

On 12 July 1942 "some German officers, a German- and a Norwegian physician came for an inspection of the camp" (...) The SS officers' suspicion of typhoid fever was confirmed by this [Norwegian] doctor. Typhoid fever must be diagnosed thru blood- or stool samples. (...) The physical symptoms that the prisoners had, concurred, but neither the Norwegian- or German MD took blood tests. The Norwegian doctor picked out 85 prisoners who allegedly had typhoid fever. He supposedly did not examine them thoroughly, but [he] picked out the prisoners from a distance because they looked frail. They were immediately sent to the infirmary".

The Beisfjord camp was quarantined by the SS on 15 July 1942 allegedly to avoid an outbreak of typhus. According to Ljubo Mladjenovic (a former prisoner) in his 1989 book, conditions at the camp were unhealthy and there was an outbreak of typhus. Prisoners with various illnesses were moved into two barracks, which were surrounded by barbed wire.

On the evening of 17 July, the 588 "prisoners regarded as healthy" were marched out of the camp by nearly all of the Norwegian guards and some German superiors.

=== After prisoners regarded as healthy were marched out of the Beisfjord camp ===
The remaining "weak and exhausted" prisoners (in Beisfjord) were ordered to dig graves and then ordered into standing positions where they would drop into the grave after the guards had shot them. These 288 prisoners were killed in groups of twenty.

Those prisoners who could not stand on their own feet, were left in the two barracks and these were then doused in gasoline and set on fire. Some sources say that a number of prisoners refused to leave the infirmary, and the building was set ablaze; those who jumped out of the windows were shot. Those who tried to escape the conflagration, were shot by a machine gun in the watch tower.

Seventeen Norwegian guards were present and played a role during the massacre. (The guard staff of the camp consisted of around 150 men from Ordnungspolizei—controlled by the SS—and around 50 Norwegian guards who were volunteers.)

==== Killings at Bjørnfjell ====
On the evening of July 17, the 588 prisoners deemed "healthy" were marched out of the Beisfjord Camp by nearly all of the Norwegian guards and some German superiors. Their destination was 30 km (19 mi) north-east — Bjørnefjell. At Bjørnfjell they were quarantined, and a camp at Øvre Jernvann was established. "On 22 July, two days after arrival at Bjørnfjell, all the prisoners had to run around the camp six times. Those prisoners who were not able, were shot." 10 prisoners were picked out and shot "farther down by the lake" [Jernvann]. Runs of this kind were held at other times, resulting in deaths every time. After five weeks on the mountain, 242 prisoners were dead. "The last 43 were [those classified as] sick who were shot" during the hike back to Beisfjord.

== Legacy ==
In the spring of 1946 "seven of the circa twenty SS officers that worked at the camps at Beisfjord and Øvre Jernvann were arrested and transported to Belgrade" (...) Everyone received the death sentence. Also Norwegian guards that had killed or violated prisoners were arrested after the war and convicted", according to HL-senteret.

In 1949 a monument in memory of the Yugoslavs [at Beisfjord] was erected.

== Reactions to the massacre ==
Pål Nygaard (author and researcher) said that "Not long after the war" Nils Christie "took an interest in the Yugoslavian prisoners. Christie thought that research (en studie) of their prison guards, was the best way we in Norway could gain knowledge and understanding (...) He wanted to dig deeper where others waved off the actions [merely] as evil. In Norway there was little interest in reading – or listening to him. Killings and brutality belonged to the others, the bad: occupants. – Still it is like that".

A 2015 Dagbladet article was written by Guri Hjeltnes.

=== Criticism of lack of focus on the involvement of Norwegian paramilitary soldiers ===
In 2009, Aftenposten wrote "That Norwegian pupils are sent on organized bus trips to Germany and Poland to get a sense of the atrocities there, without knowing that equivalent atrocities were committed in Norway, puzzles the leader of Nordnorsk Fredssenter in Narvik". Adding "That the events [of the massacre] were covered up, is feared by the head of a war museum in Narvik (Nordland Røde Kors Krigsminnemuseum), because members of a paramilitary force of Norwegians – Hirden – participated in the atrocities". In 2010 Fritt Ord sponsored research that has led to an exhibition (from 12 August 2012) at the Falstad Center.

=== Efraim Zuroff ===
In 2013 Efraim Zuroff reportedly "has eyed the groups of war criminals that he thinks there is reason to still hunt: It concerns soldiers from SS-Division Wiking that amongst other things, participated in massacring Jews on the Eastern Front 70 years ago; soldiers that served in Hirdvaktbataljonen in North Norway and who exposed Serbian POWs for horrific violations; and Norwegians that participated in arrests of Jews during the war. Many of them were convicted, but not for what they really did". The same article said that Norway's Department of Justice had scheduled a meeting with Zuroff on 20 November 2013, but a misunderstanding within the department led to Zuroff not being notified. State Secretary Vidar Brein-Karlsen has said that he will gladly meet with representatives from the Wiesenthal Centre to hear what they have to say.

== See also ==
- Nazi concentration camps in Norway
- Massacre in Karasjok in 1943
- Blodveien "The blood road"

== Literature ==
- Mladjenović, Ljubo. Oversatt av Brit Bakker. «Beisfjordtragedien», Oslo: Grøndahl, 1989. ISBN 82-504-1723-2
- Nygaard, Paal Store drømmer og harde realiteter ["great dreams and tough reality"] (2014)
