= Blood Road Museum =

Museum in Norway

- Blodveimuseet
- Location in Nordland Blood Road Museum (Norway)
- Established: 1995
- Location: Saltdal, Norway
- Coordinates: 67°6′5.72″N 15°25′38.71″E
- Website: http://nordlandsmuseet.no/blodveimuseet/

The Blood Road Museum (Norwegian: Blodveimuseet) is a museum in Saltdal Municipality in Nordland county, Norway. The museum was established in 1995 to mark the 50th anniversary of the end of the Second World War. The museum is located about 2 kilometers (1.2 mi) north of the center of Rognan and stands in the yard of the Saltdal Museum, which is part of the Nordland Museum.

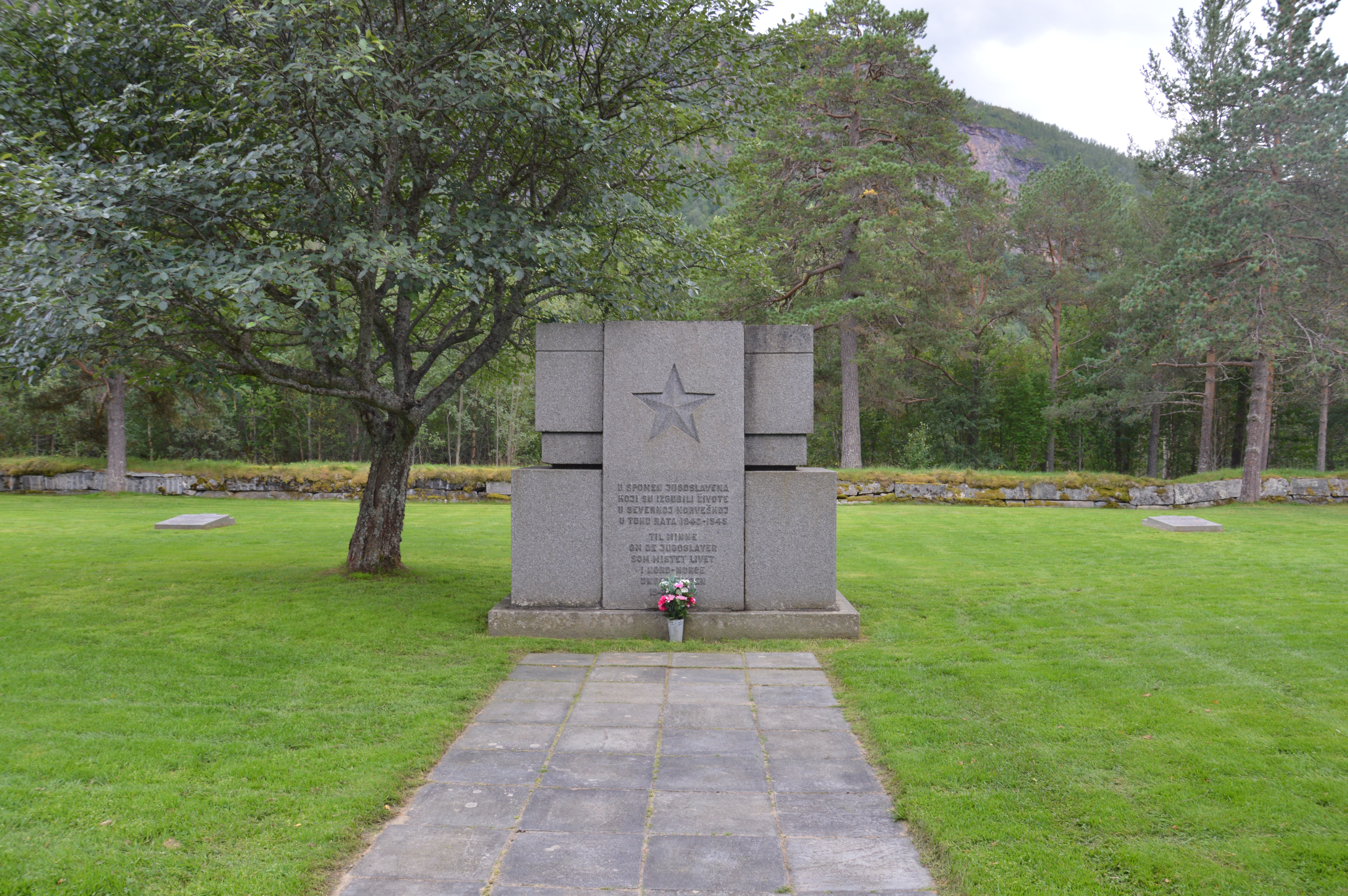
Yugoslav cemetery in Botn

The museum documents the history of the Yugoslav, Polish, and Soviet prisoners of war that built the Blood Road between Rognan and Langset in Saltdal Municipality between 1942 and 1945 under the direction of the German occupation authorities. It also tells about how the prisoners of war lived and worked in the Dunderlandsdalen, Nord-Rana, and Korgen.

There are two cemeteries in Botn, one for the Yugoslavs and another for the Germans. There is also a Soviet memorial where there was formerly a Soviet cemetery.
