= Hirden =

Paramilitary organization

- The insignia of the Hirden

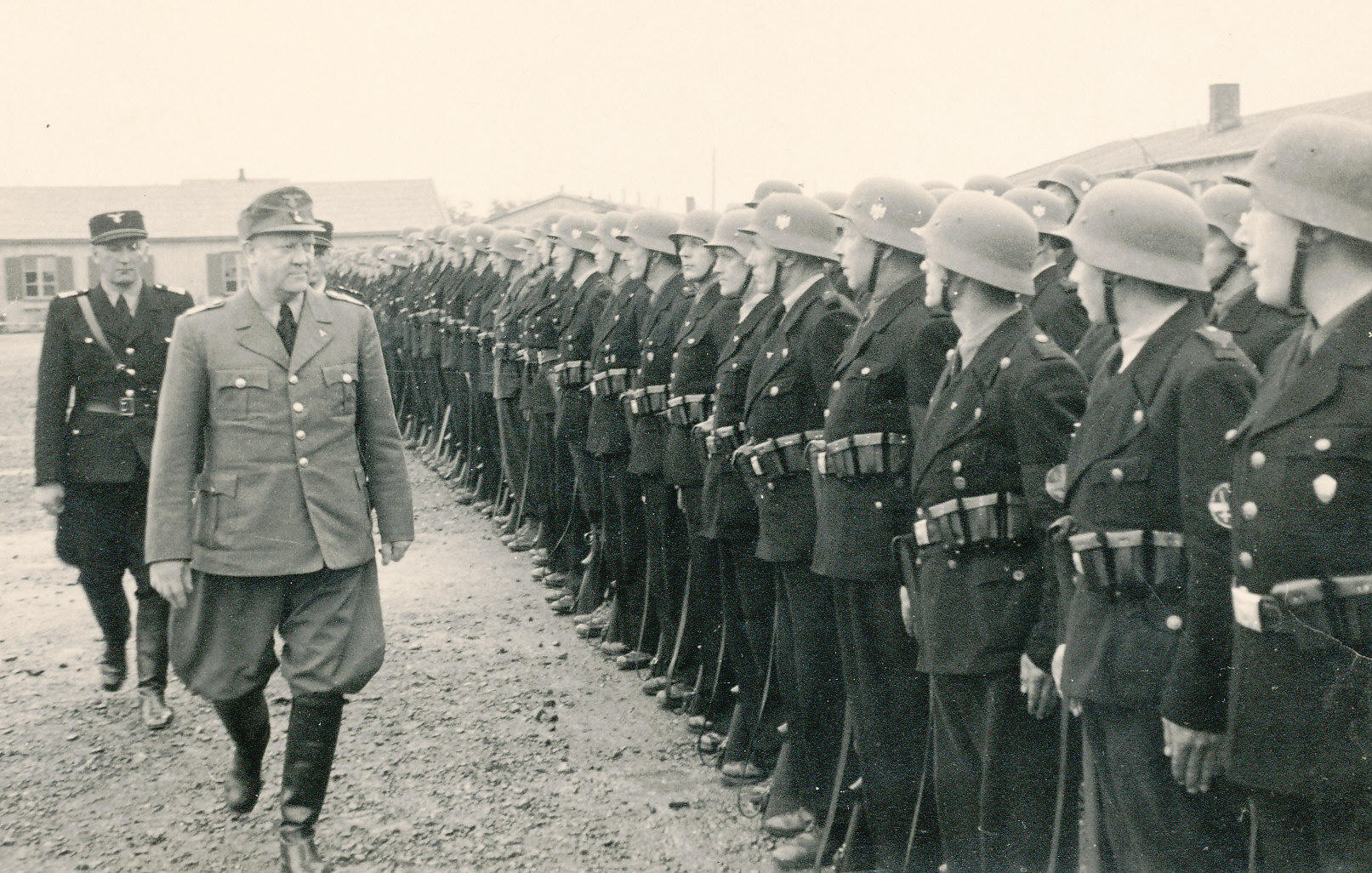
- Vidkun Quisling and Oliver Møystad inspecting Rikshirden.

Organization overview
- Formed: 1940
- Dissolved: 1945
- Type: Paramilitary
- Jurisdiction: German-occupied Norway
- Headquarters: Hirdens hus, Oslo
- Parent organization: Nasjonal Samling

Hirden (the hird) was a uniformed paramilitary organisation during the occupation of Norway by Nazi Germany, modelled the same way as the German Sturmabteilungen.

== Overview ==
Vidkun Quisling's fascist party Nasjonal Samling frequently used words and symbols from the old Norse Viking era. During the Second World War, membership was compulsory for all Nasjonal Samling members. In total, about 8,500 Norwegians were members of Hirden during the war. The organisation was dissolved after the liberation, and many of its former members were prosecuted and convicted for treason and collaboration.

== History ==
During the German occupation Hirden got a more military slant. The intention was that it should form the nucleus of a future Norwegian Nazi army, and a "hirdmarine" (Hirden navy) and a "Hirdens flykorps"(Hirden's air force corps) were created in 1942 in addition to the real Hirden, Rikshirden. However, many Hirden members volunteered to Norwegian military units in the war on the Nazi German side or served as guards in the various prison camps. Hirden had a broad mandate to conduct operations against dissidents, independent of all police authorities, many of which included the use of violence.

A 2014 Dagsavisen article said that "8 of 10" prisoners "died in the prison camps where Hirden performed guard duty under the leadership of SS".

== List of Hirden branches ==
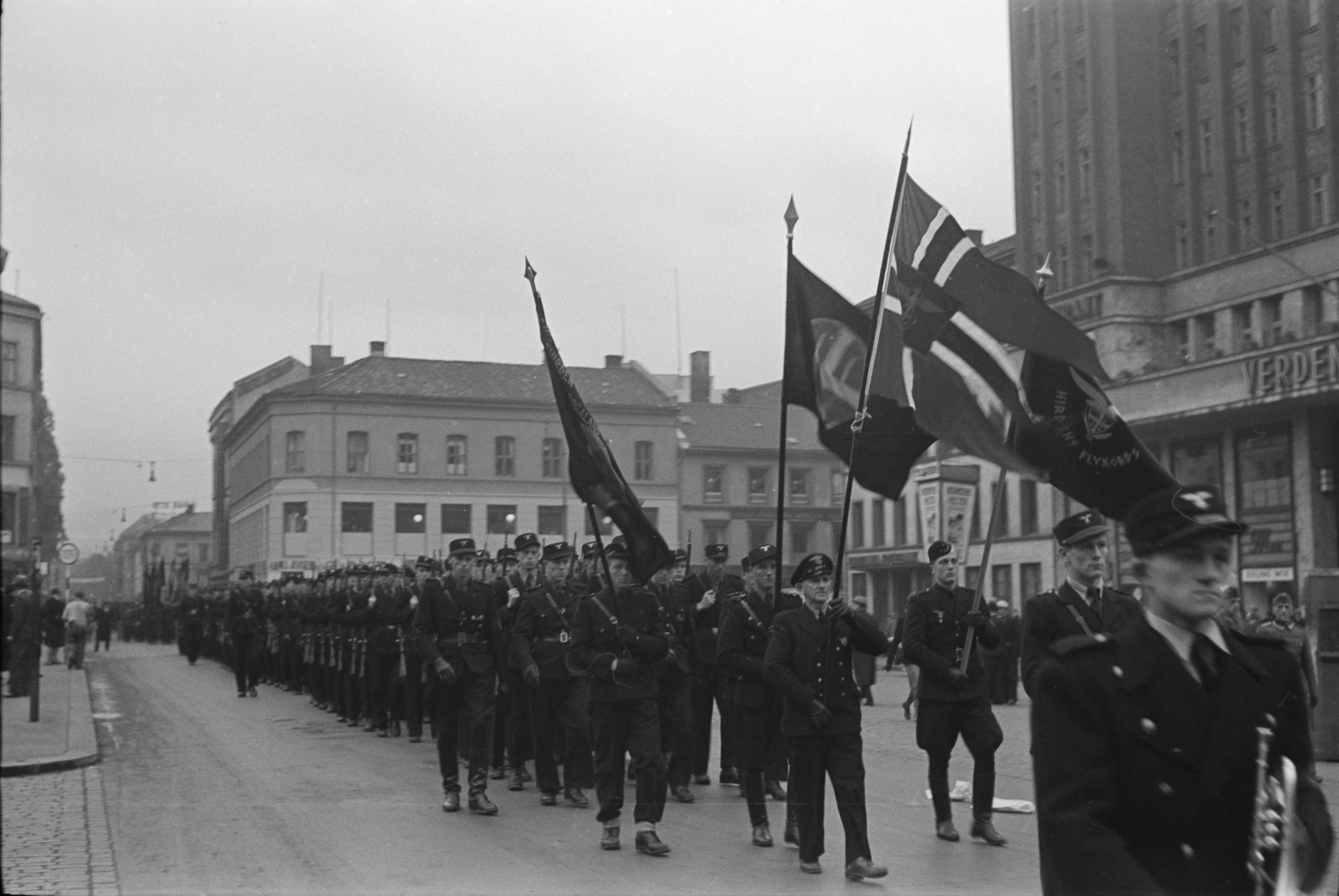
Hirden soldiers marching through Youngstorget, Oslo in 1943. The flag bearers in front carrying the flags of several Hirden branches, such as the Rikshirden, Hirdmarienen, and Hirdens Flykorps.

=== Main Hirden organisations ===
Insignia	Flag	Name	Period	Description
		Rikshirden (transl. National Hirden or Hirden of the realm)	1933–1945	Rikshirden is the most important Hirden organisation and usually the one referred to by just Hirden. Rikshirden was responsible for ensuring the security of NS party members and Quisling regime officials.
		Hirdvaktbataljonen (transl. Hirden Guard Battalion)	1942–1943	Short-lived Hirden branch which primarily served guard duty at prison lairs, including foreign prisons. After the branch was dissolved, many of the members joined SS-vaktbatalijon (SS Guard battalion).
		Førergarde (transl. Leader guard)	1942–1945	The personal guards of the party leader (fører); Vidkun Quisling. The guard was made up of 150 handpicked voluntary recruits. They served much the same purpose as the former Royal Guards.
		Hirdens Flykorps (transl. Hirden Air Force Corps)	1942–1945	Hirdens Flykorps was meant to form the basis for a future Norwegian air force. Most members eventually joined the German Luftwaffe. The fleet was rather basic, only featuring some primary glider aircraft.
		Hirdmarinen (transl. Hirden Navy)	1942–1945	Hirdmarinen was meant to form the basis for a future Norwegian navy. Most members eventually joined the German Kriegsmarine. The fleet was small, featuring only a couple small sailboats.
		Hirdens Alarmenheter (transl. Hirdens Alarm Units)	1943–1945	Operated guard duty and helped Statspolitiet as part of the "armed forces of the realm".
		Hirdens Bedriftsvern (transl. Hirdens Corporate Protection)	1943–1945	Armed forces supposed to protect industry and state institutions against sabotage.
		Hirdbataljonen (transl. Hirden Battalion)	1945	Military mobilization of NS members.

=== Related organisations not directly subject to the Rikshirden ===
Insignia	Flag	Name	Period	Description
		Kvinnehirden (transl. Women's Hirden)	1934–1945	Kvinnehirden was a branch of the NS Kvinneorganisajonen (transl. NS Women's Organisation). Despite being named a Hird, they were not officially part of the proper Hirden and did not serve any military function and instead provided sanitation; therefore, their flags and emblems lacked the swords in the sun cross.
		Germanic SS Norway	1941–1945	Originally called Norges SS ('Norway's SS'). GSSN was formally a subdivision of the Hirden, but very controversial within the NS party due to its close ties to Germany as a de facto branch of Allgemeine SS.

=== Youth organisations with Hirden names ===
Insignia	Flag	Name	Period	Description
		Unghirden (transl. Youth Hirden)	1934–1945	Branch of NS Ungdomsfylking (transl. NS Youth League), intended for boys between 14 and 18. It was largely modeled on the German Hitler Youth.
		Guttehirden (transl. Boys Hirden)	1934–1945	Branch of NS Youth League, intended for boys between 10 and 15.
		Jentehirden / Gjentehirden (transl. Girls Hirden)	1934–1945	Branch of NS Youth League, intended for girls between 15 and 21.
		Småhirden (transl. Small Hirden)	1934–1945	Branch of NS Youth League, intended for girls between 9–15.

== Gallery ==
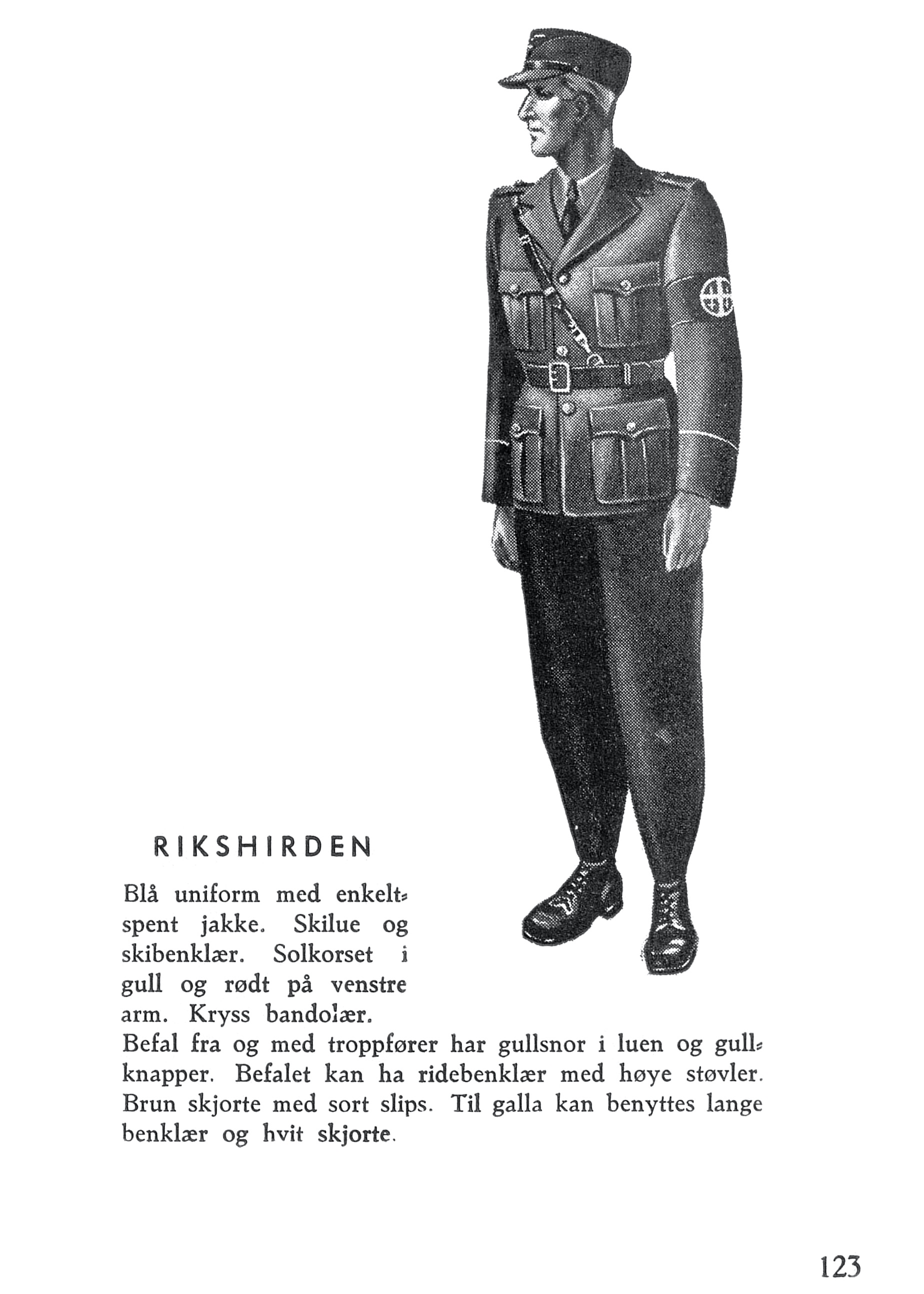

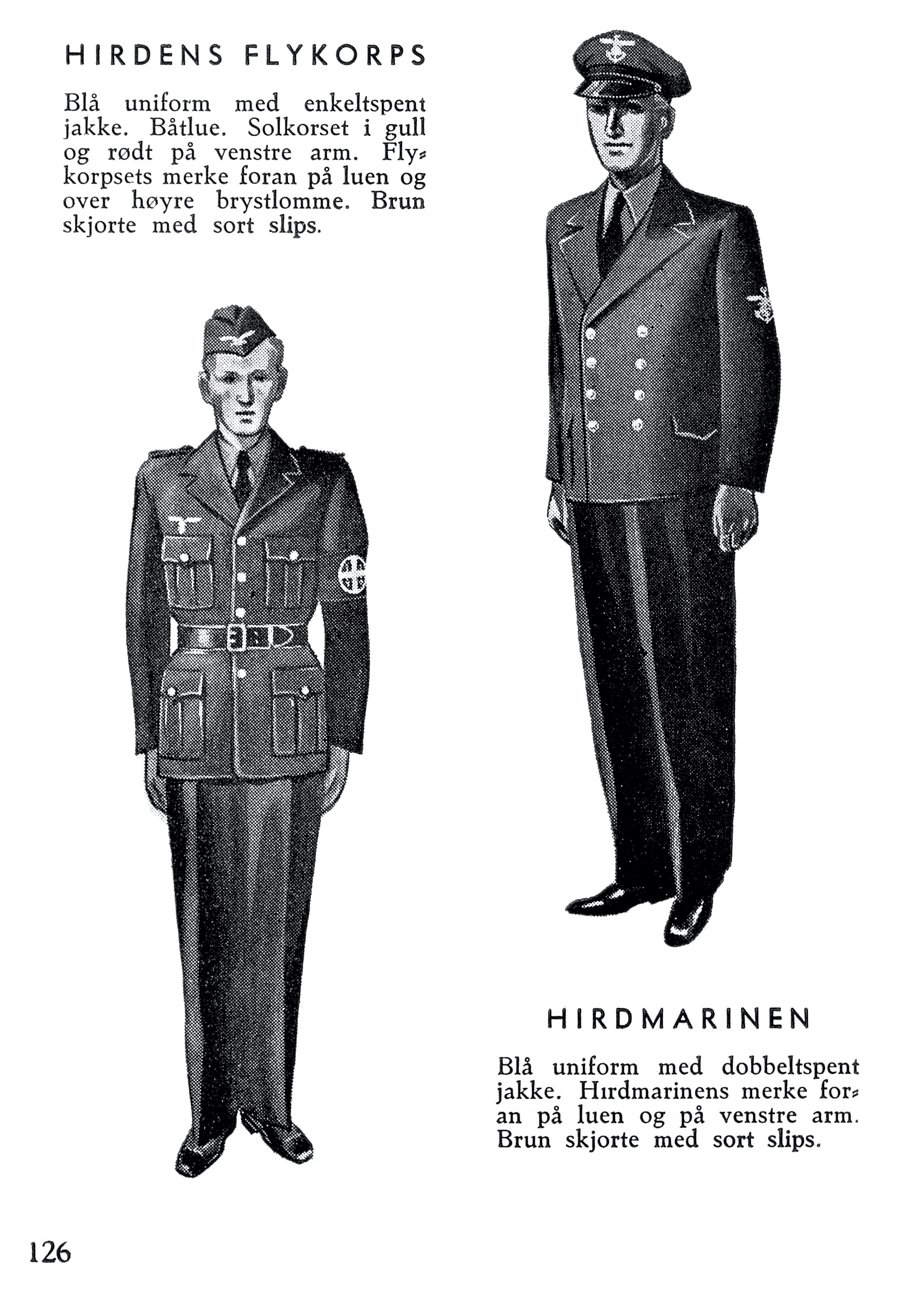
Uniform of the naval hird, Hirdmarinen.

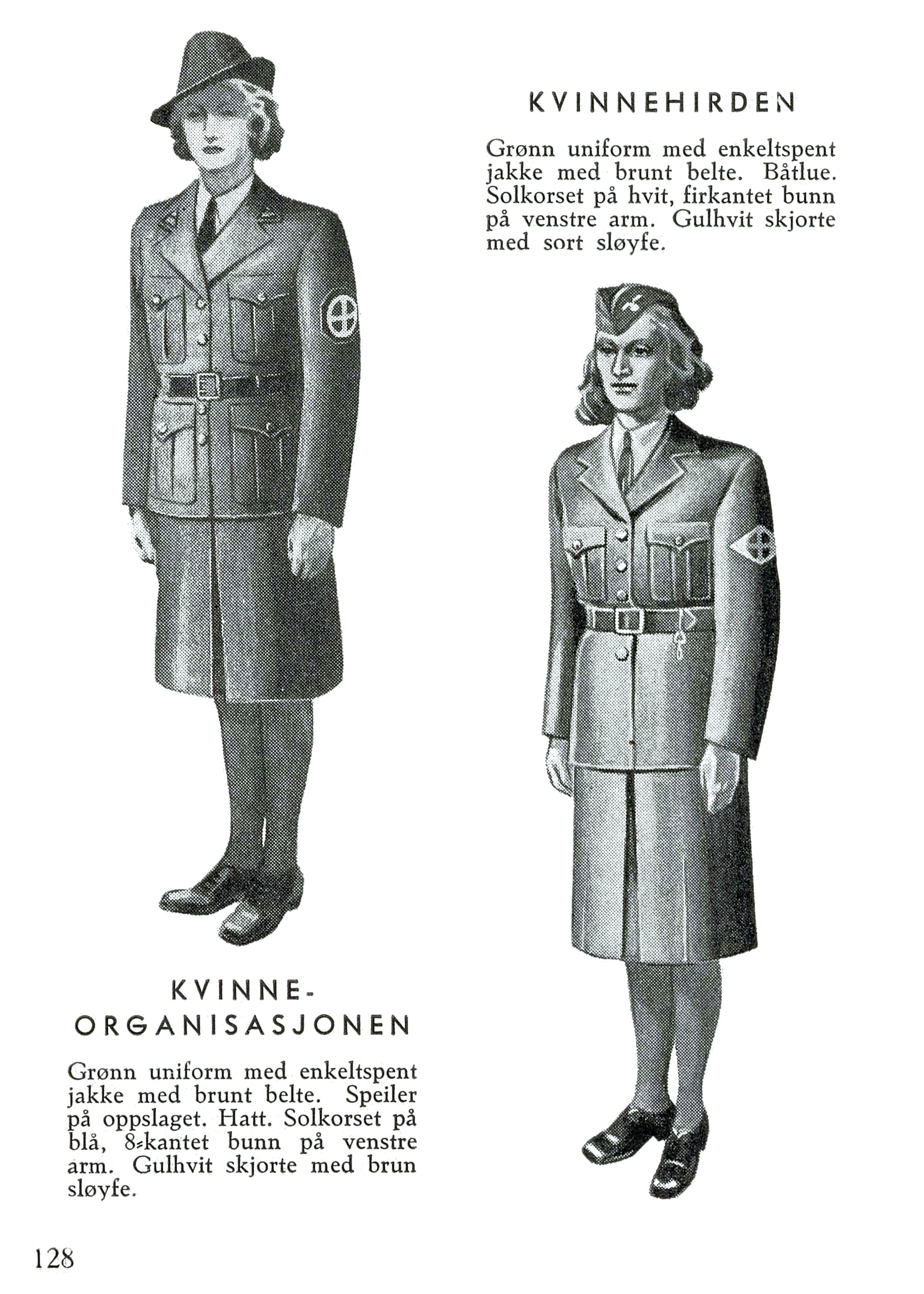
Uniform of the female hird, Kvinnehirden.

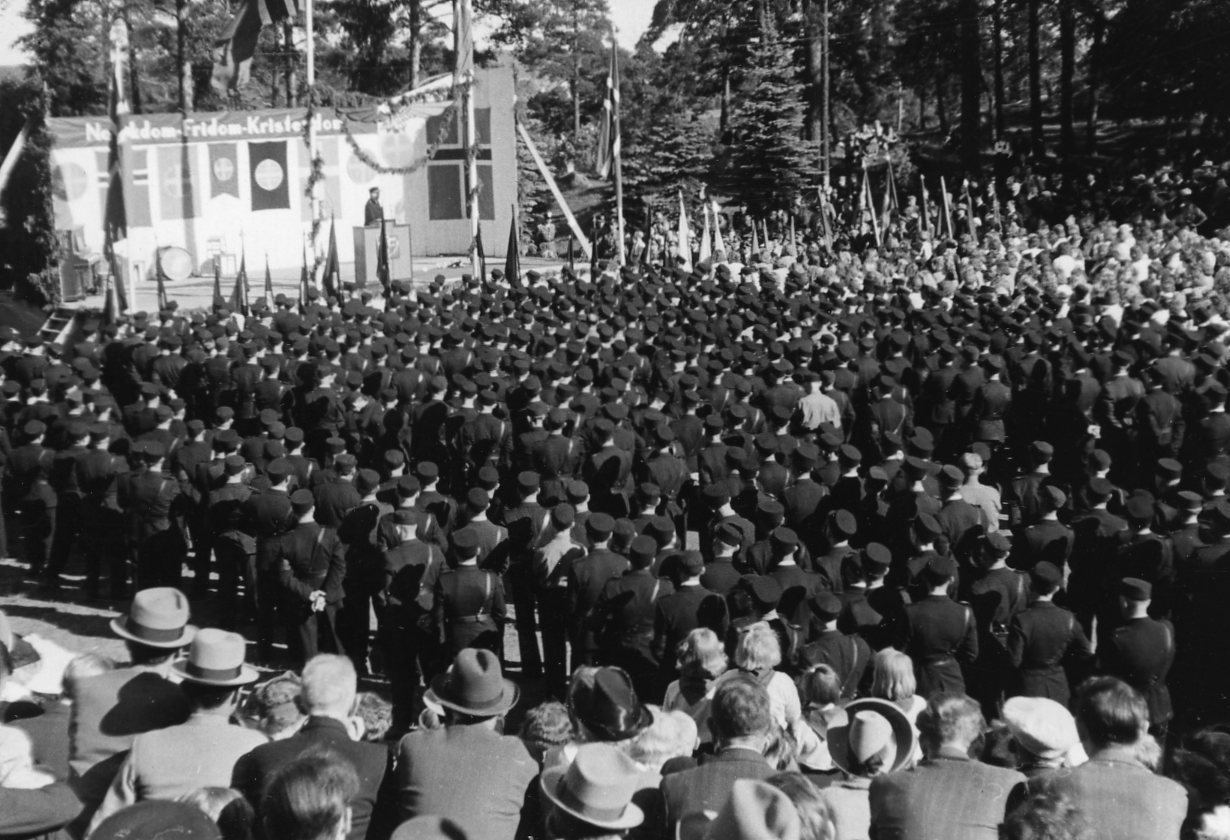
Vidkun Quisling on the rostrum speaks to Hirden in Sarpsborg.

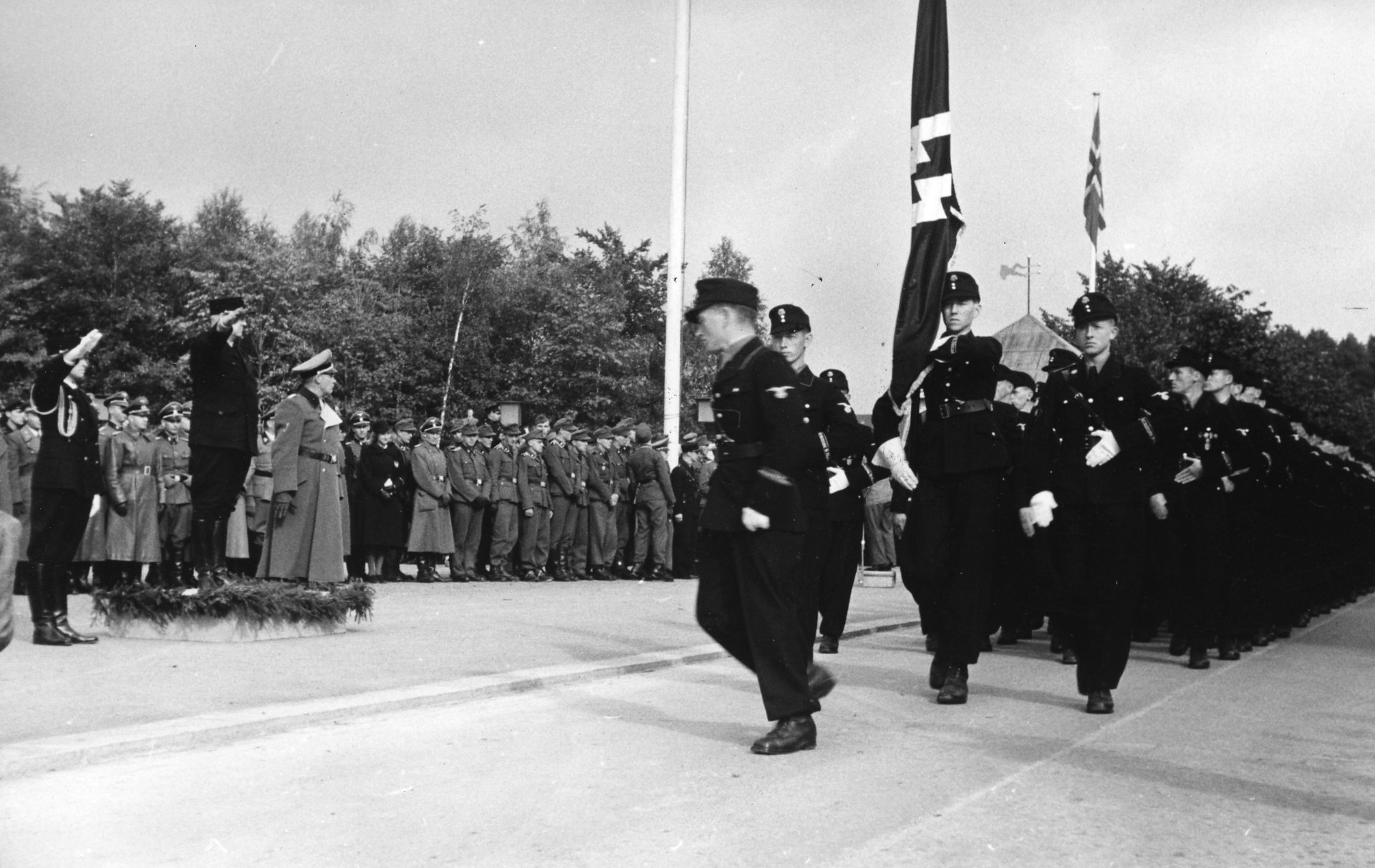
Hirden spectacle march to be greeted by Quisling.

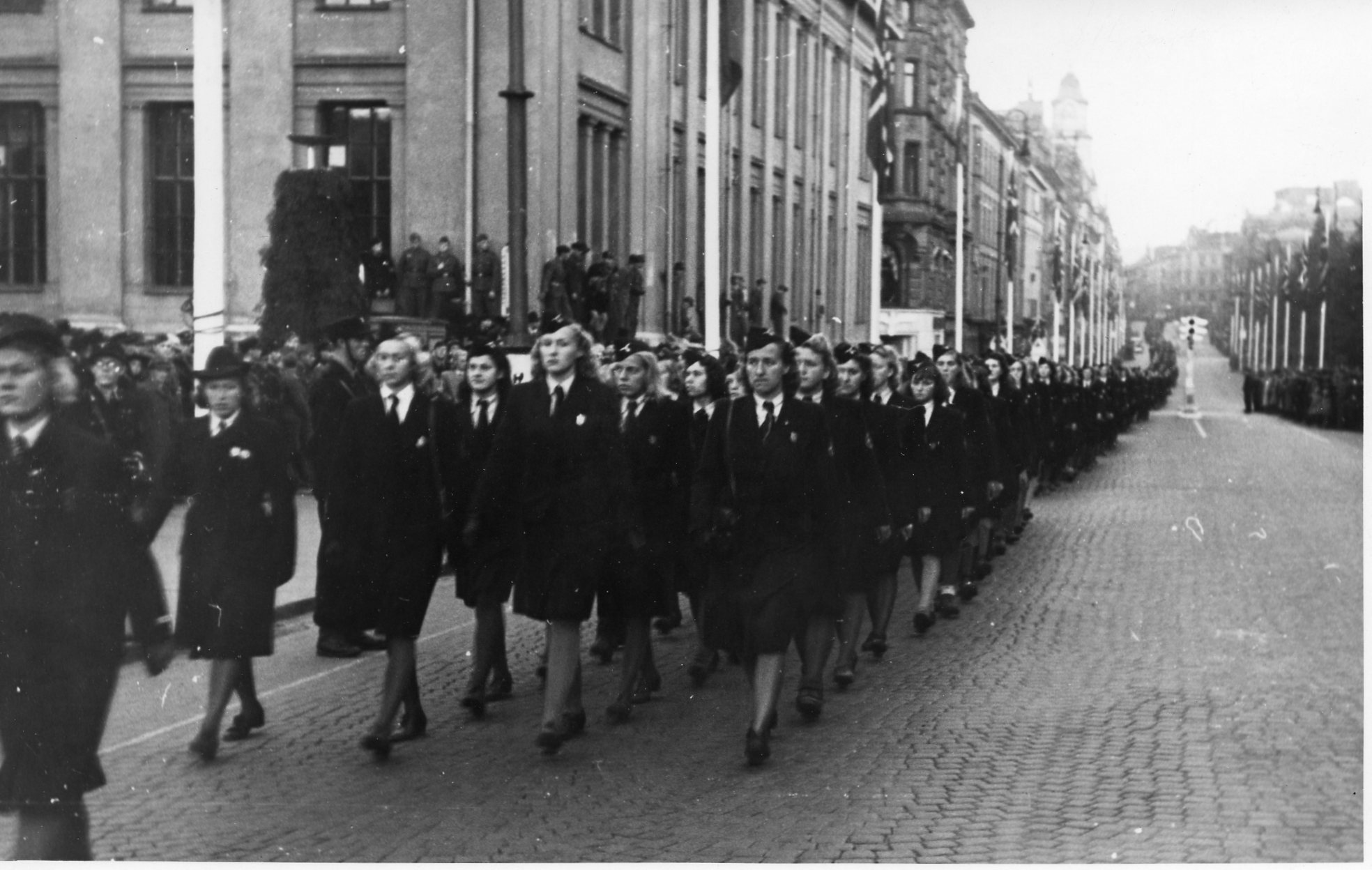
Hirden women march up Oslo's main street.

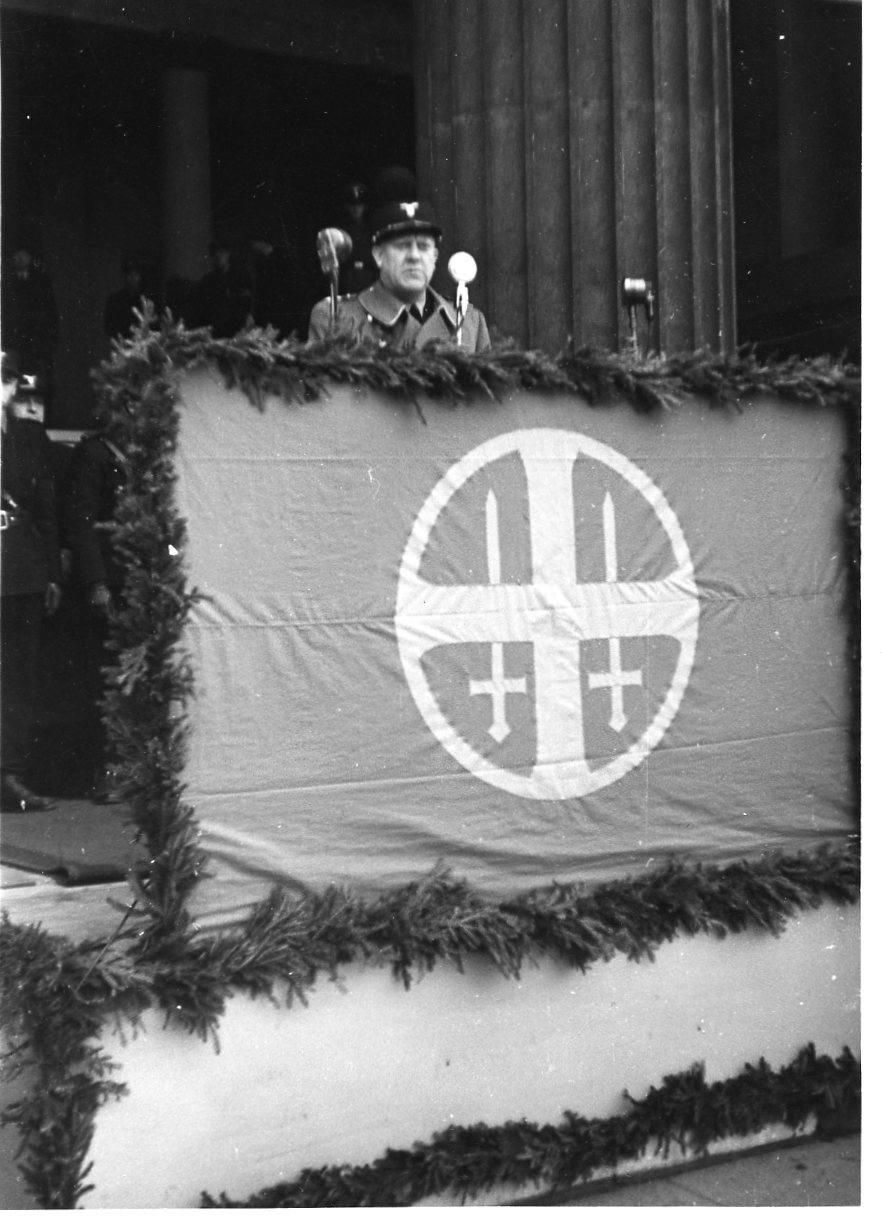
Quisling speaks to Hirden after oath has been given to him.

== Ranks and rank insignia ==
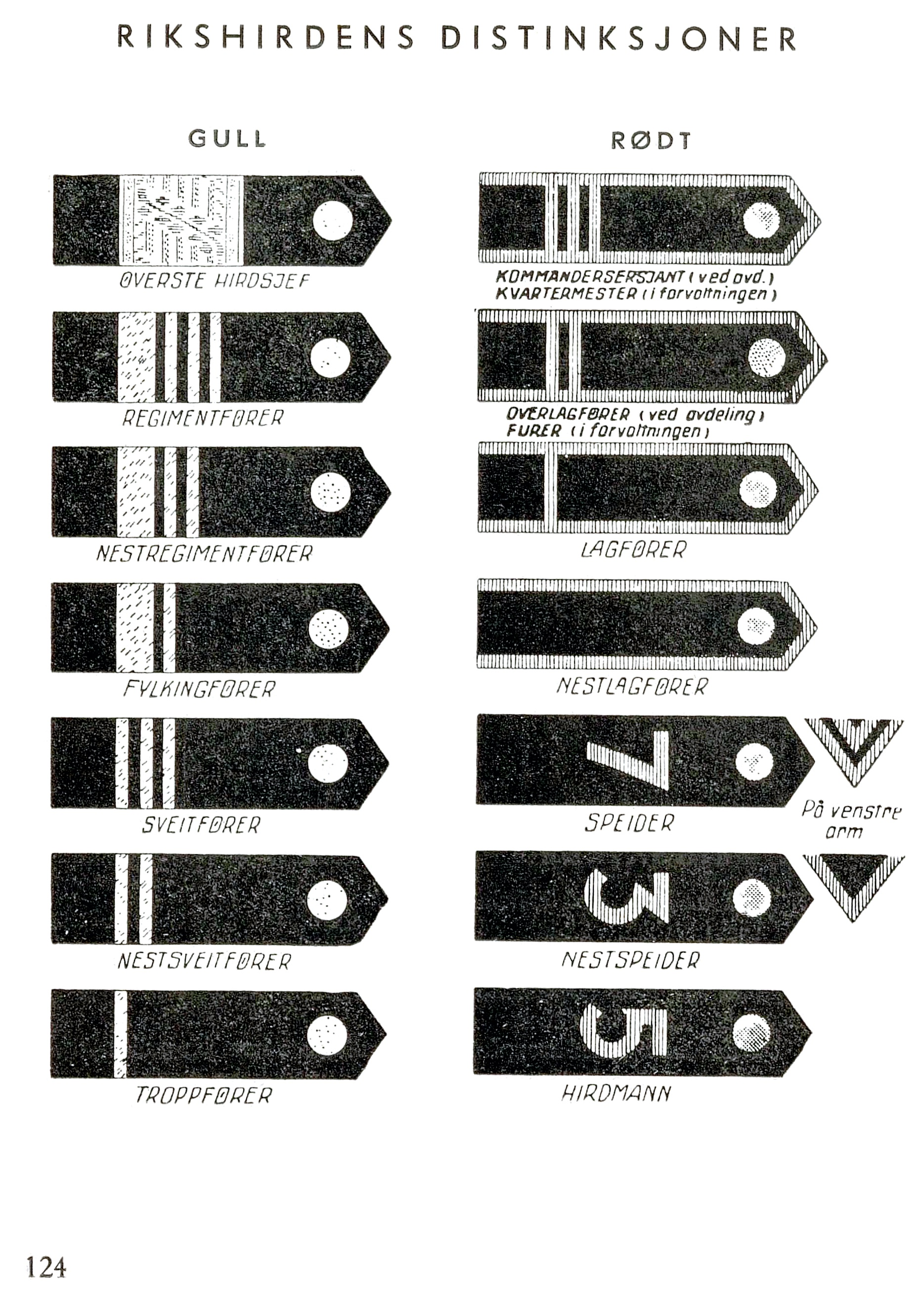
Rank insignia

Insignia	Rank	Translation	Comparative rank in the Wehrmacht
Hirdfører
	Overste hirdsjef	Senior hird chief
	Regimentsfører	Regimental commander
	Nestregimentsfører	Second regimental commander
	Fylkingfører	Wedge leader
	Sveitfører	District leader
	Nestsveitfører	Second district leader
	Troppfører	Troop commander
Underfører
	Kommandersersjant	Commander sergeant
	Kvartermester	Quartermaster
	Overlagfører	Senior squad leader
	Furer	Leader
	Lagfører	Squad leader
Mannskap
	Nestlagfører	Second squad leader
	Speider	Scout
	Nestspeider	Second scout
	Hirdmann	Hird man

== See also ==
- Beisfjord massacre
- Legal purge in Norway after World War II

== Sources ==
- Eirik Veum: Nådeløse nordmenn - Hirden, Kagge Forlag, Oslo 2013, (in Norwegian) ISBN 978-82-489-1451-8
