= Bjørnfjell, Nordland =

Village in Narvik Municipality, Norway

Bjørnfjell, Nordland Bjørnfjell (Norwegian) Bonjovárri (Northern Sami) Historic spelling: Bjørnefjell (until 1921/25)
- Village
- Interactive map of Bjørnfjell, Nordland
- Location within Nordland Location within Norway
- Coordinates: 68.4491°N 18.0889°E
- Country: Norway
- Region: Northern Norway
- County: Nordland
- District: Ofoten
- Municipality: Narvik Municipality
- Elevation: 760 m (2,490 ft)
- Time zone: UTC+01:00 (CET)
  - Summer (DST): UTC+02:00 (CEST)
- Post Code: 8517 Narvik

Bjørnfjell (Northern Sami: Bonjovárri) is a mountain village made up of holiday cottages in Narvik Municipality in Nordland county, Norway. It's located along the Ofotbanen railway line and the European route E10 highway, just west of the border with Sweden. There is a railway station and the Bjørnfjell Chapel as well as many cabins and homes in the area. The name Bjørnfjell for short may often refer to the Bjørnfjell Railway Station. The area is a popular vacation spot for residents of Narvik.

== History ==
The mountain got its name during the planning of the railway line in 1883. The old railway station was named Bjørnefjell while it was being used from 1912 to 1925. A new railway station was constructed in 1921 and the name of the new station dropped the middle e from the spelling.

The Battle of Bjørnefjell occurred on 15 April 1940 as part of the Narvik Campaign during World War II. A Norwegian company which had escaped from the city of Narvik by traveling along the railway line during the German invasion of April 9 was defeated by superior German forces. After capturing the Bjørnfjell area, the Germans used the area to drop supplies and soldiers from Ju 88 airplanes. The stone cottage "Solheimsbrakka" was used as headquarters by the Lieutenant General Eduard Dietl during most of the Battle of Narvik. A German prison camp was later established north west of Bjørnfjell. Yugoslav partisans were interned there, and 238 died.

In 1942, there were massacres of POWs at Beisfjord and Bjørnfjell.

== See also ==
- The massacres at Beisfjord and Bjørnfjell
