= Oliver Møystad =

Norwegian soldier, engineer, and farmer (1892–1956)

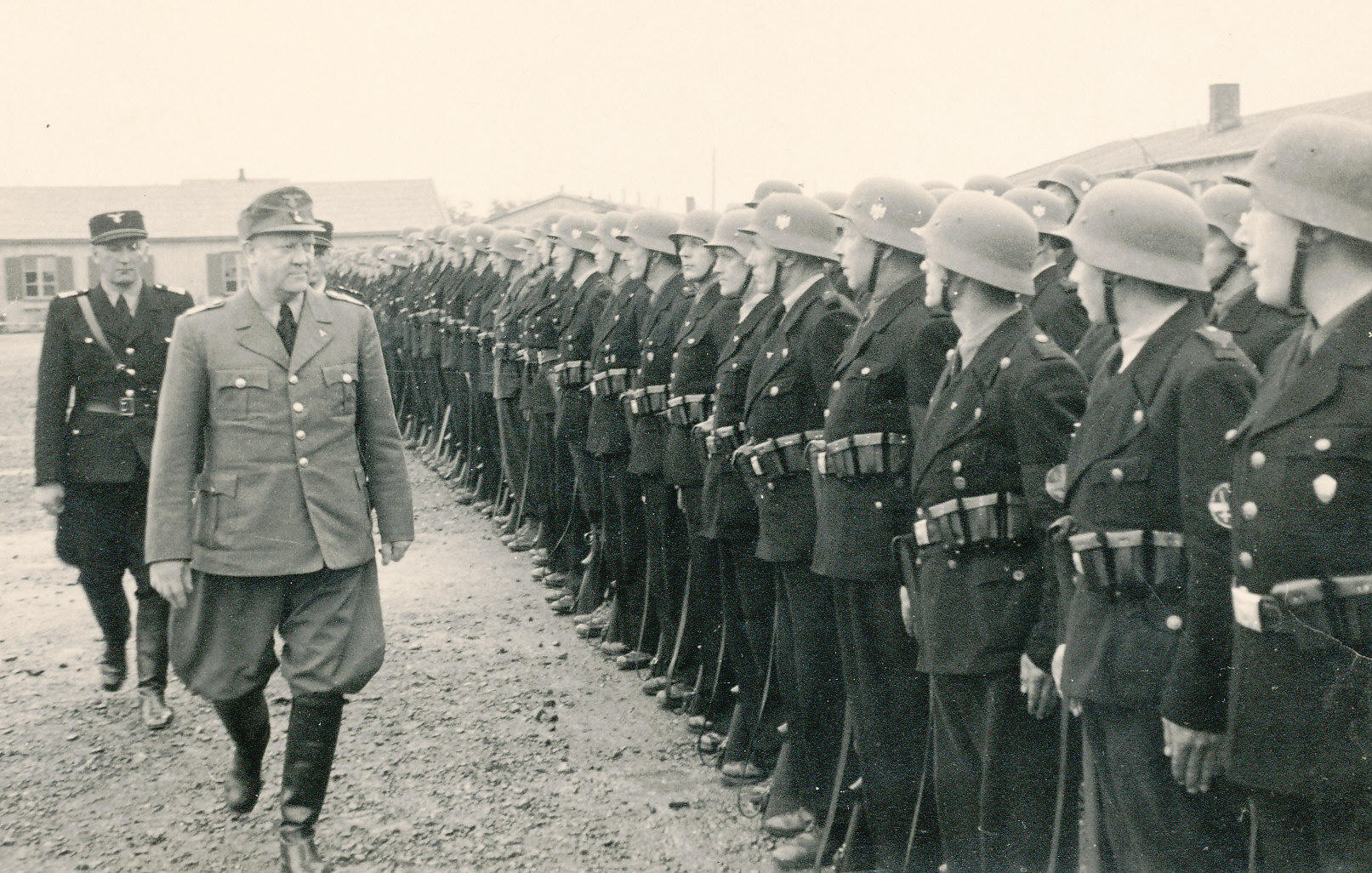
- Vidkun Quisling and Oliver Møystad (behind Quisling, in a dark uniform) inspecting Rikshirden

Personal details
- Born: 15 June 1892 Hernes, Elverum Municipality, Norway
- Died: 28 June 1956 (aged 64)
- Party: Nasjonal Samling (1933–1945)
- Parent(s): Hans Møystad; Marthine Emerentze Cappele
- Relatives: Diderich Cappelen Møystad (brother); Georg Jacob Falck Bull (brother-in-law)
- Military Service
- Allegiance: Norway
- Branch: Norwegian Army
- Service years: 1940
- Rank: Captain
- Unit: Østoppland Infantry Regiment No. 5
- Conflicts: Second World War; Norwegian campaign; Battle of Midtskogen

Oliver Møystad (15 June 1892 – 28 June 1956) was a Norwegian engineer, farmer and forest owner. During the Norwegian Campaign in April 1940 he commanded Norwegian troops at the Battle of Midtskogen. During the German occupation of Norway, he served as leader of the collaborationist security police from 1941 to 1943, and Hirden from 1942 to 1944. After the war, Møystad was convicted of treason, sentenced to 10 years of forced labor, and fined NOK 150,000 during the legal purge in Norway after World War II. He was released in 1950.
