= Rognan =

Village in Saltdal Municipality, Norway

- Village
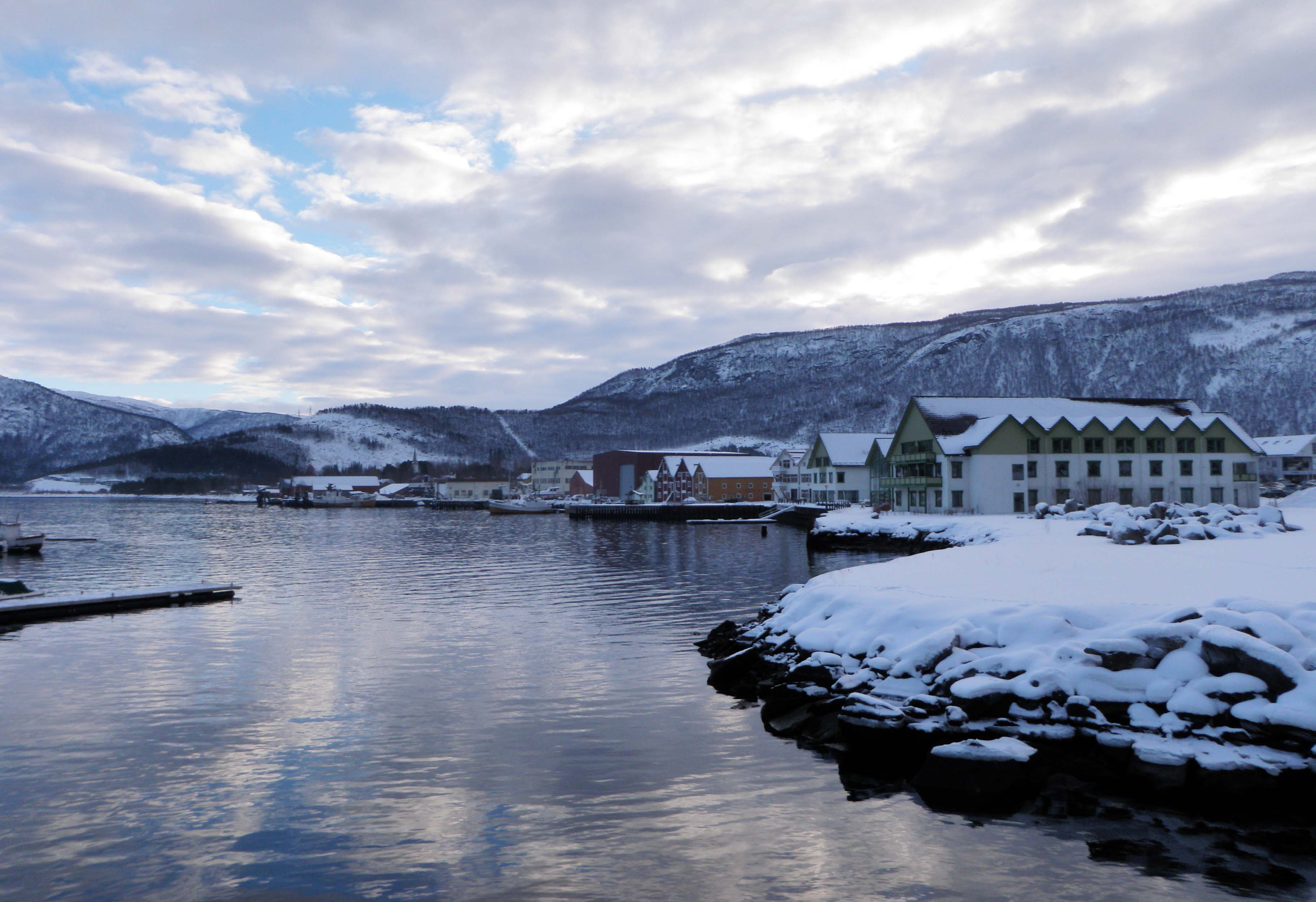
- View of the harbour area
- Interactive map of Rognan
- Location within Nordland Location within Norway
- Coordinates: 67.1002°N 15.3909°E
- Country: Norway
- Region: Northern Norway
- County: Nordland
- District: Salten
- Municipality: Saltdal Municipality

Area
  - Total: 2.54 km^{2} (0.98 sq mi)
- Elevation: 6 m (20 ft)

Population (2023)
  - Total: 2,600
  - Density: 1,024/km^{2} (2,650/sq mi)
- Time zone: UTC+01:00 (CET)
  - Summer (DST): UTC+02:00 (CEST)
- Post Code: 8250 Rognan

Rognan is a village and the administrative centre of Saltdal Municipality in Nordland county, Norway. The village is located at the head of the Saltdal Fjord (the innermost part of the Skjerstad Fjord). It is located about 15 kilometres (9.3 mi) north of the village of Røkland.

The 2.54-square-kilometre (630-acre) village has a population (2023) of 2,600 and a population density of 1,024 inhabitants per square kilometre (2,650/sq mi).

== Economy ==
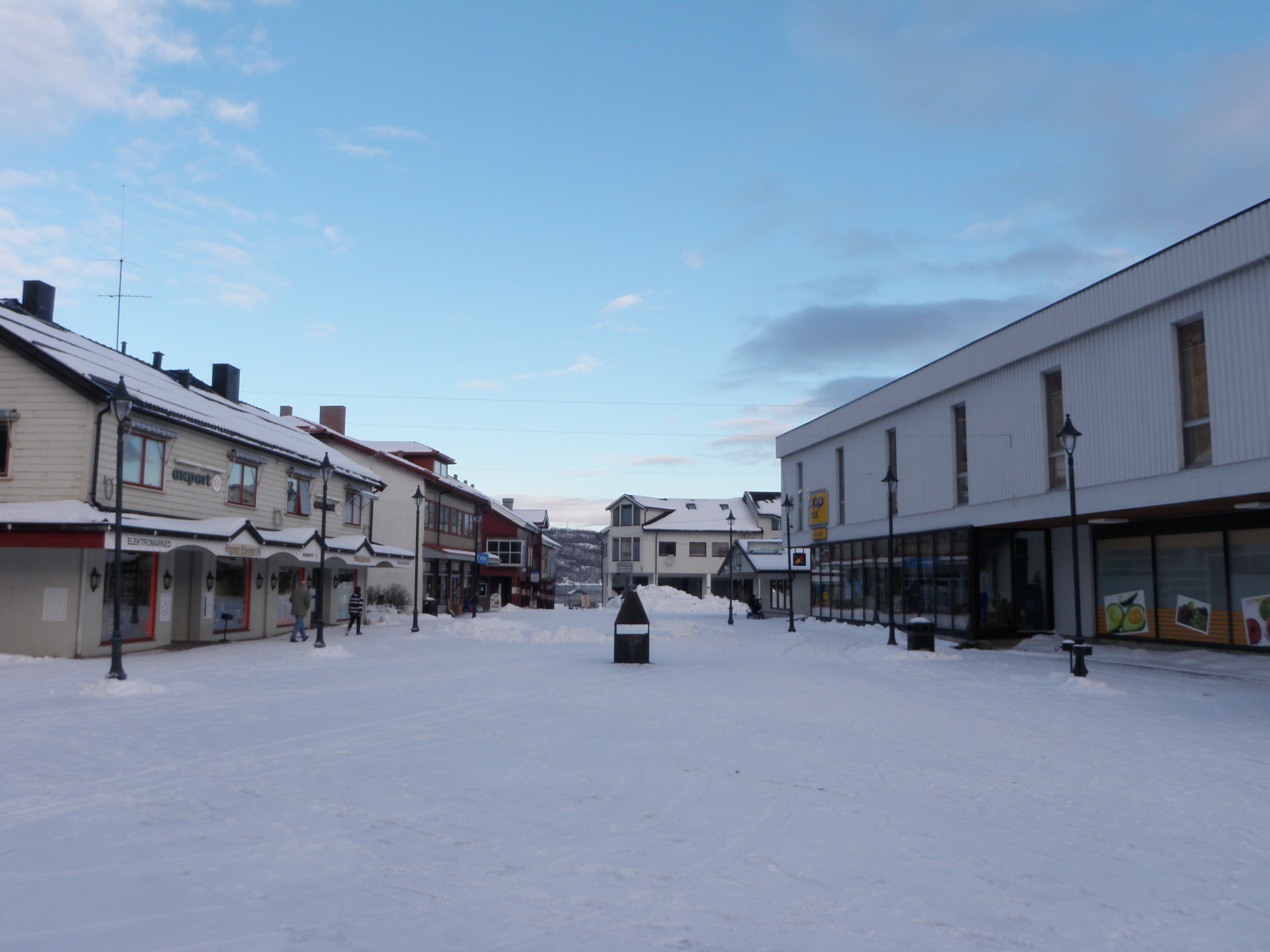
Pedestrian zone in Rognan

Local industry includes the optical cable factory of Nexans Norway and Hepro. The Nordland Line railway and the European route E6 highway both pass through the village. Rognan Station is the local railway station. Rognan Airport only serves general aviation. Saltdal Church is located in this village.

Rognan gained national attention through a 2006 reality documentary television series called "Alt For Rognan" (Everything for Rognan). The show aired on TV2, and followed a group of ten local men and their quest to create a live show on the cabaret and revue theatre Chat Noir.

== Sister cities ==
Rognan is twinned with the following cities:

- Niš, Serbia

== See also ==
- Prison camps in North Norway during World War Two
