= Blodveien (film) =

- Directed by: Kåre Bergstrøm; Radoš Novaković
- Written by: Sigurd Evensmo
- Produced by: Arild Brinchmann; Mladen Todić
- Starring: Ola Isene; Andreas Bjarke; Tom Tellefsen; Milan Milošević
- Cinematography: Ragnar Sørensen
- Edited by: Nevenka Paskuljević
- Music by: Predrag Milošević
- Distributed by: Norsk Film AS; Avala Film
- Release date: 1955
- Running time: 94 minutes
- Countries: Norway; Yugoslavia
- Languages: Norwegian; Serbo-Croatian

Blodveien (The Blood Road; Serbo-Croatian: Krvavi put) is a Norwegian-Yugoslav drama film from 1955 directed by Kåre Bergstrøm and Radoš Novaković. The script was written by Sigurd Evensmo. The film premiered in Norway on February 17, 1955.

== Plot ==
Blodveien portrays the conditions that Yugoslav (mostly Serbian) slave laborers and prisoners of war lived under in Northern Norway in 1942 during the Second World War, when the Germans wanted to build the route known as the "Blood Road" (today part of European route E6 among other routes).

Two local Norwegian friends and construction workers, Ketil and Ivar, serve as construction supervisors on the road under pressure from the Germans. They had earlier helped build the small concentration camp that prisoners later lived in, without understanding what they were involved in. The prisoners are sympathetic toward them because they try to help them to the extent that they can. The Germans take harsh revenge after an escape attempt by shooting some of the prisoners. The Germans, led by the sadistic Schwarz, terrorize and kill prisoners at random almost daily.

Ketil's young son Magnar is bored at home on the small mountain farm and wants to get out and do something with his life. He enlists with the German forces and is made a guard at the prison camp. The prisoner Janko escapes from the camp after being shot by Schwarz. He receives help along the way after his dramatic escape, and is on his way over the mountains toward neutral Sweden, when he is captured by Magnar and brought at gunpoint back to the prison camp. Magnar's father Ketil, who was out seeking to help Janko, encounters them and there is a confrontation between the father and son. The father wants all three of them to escape to Sweden, but the son does not. During a scuffle between the father and son, the rifle between them discharges and the son is fatally wounded. The film ends with the father Ketil following Janko to the Swedish border and bidding him farewell with the words Frihet for mennesket 'Freedom for mankind.'

== Cast ==
- Ola Isene: Ketil
- Andreas Bjarke: Ivar
- Tom Tellefsen: Magnar, Ketil's son
- Milan Milošević: Janko
- Milivoje Živanović: Miljan
- Liv Strømsted: Ragnhild
- Lalla Carlsen: Ane
- Helge Essmar: Guttorm
- Arne Lie: a Nazi
- Thor Hjorth-Jenssen: a Nazi
- Antun Nalis: Schwarz
- Ivan Jonaš: Vlado
- Mihajlo Bata Paskaljević: the doctor
- Aca Ognjatović: the actor
- Marijan Berger: Bojan
- Dobrica Stefanović: Milenko
- Janez Vrhovec: Vuk
- Ivica Kadić: Vjeko
- Rolf Søder: a soldier
