= Saltdal =

Saltdal may refer to:

== Places ==
- Saltdal Municipality, a municipality in Nordland county, Norway
- Saltdal Fjord, a fjord in Saltdal Municipality in Nordland county, Norway
- Saltdal Church, a church in Saltdal Municipality in Nordland county, Norway
- Saltdal Valley (or Saltdalen), a valley in Saltdal Municipality in Nordland county, Norway

== See also ==
- Saltdale, California
