= Lønsdal =

Village in Saltdal Municipality, Norway

Lønsdal: Lønsdal (Norwegian); Luonosvágge (Lule Sami)
- Village
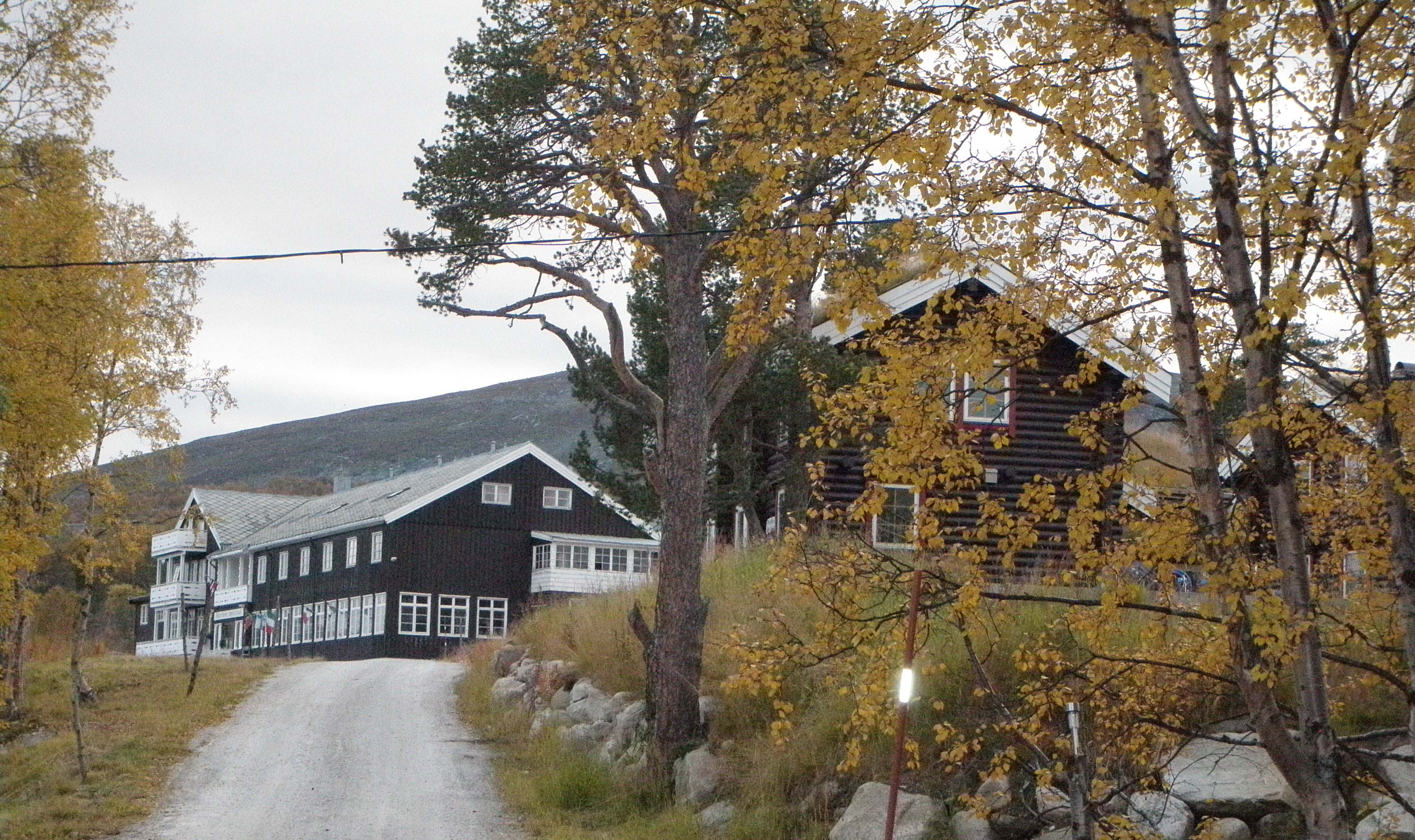
- Polarsirkelen Høyfjellshotell in Lønsdal
- Interactive map of Lønsdal
- Location within Nordland Location within Norway
- Coordinates: 66.7431°N 15.4634°E
- Country: Norway
- Region: Northern Norway
- County: Nordland
- District: Salten
- Municipality: Saltdal Municipality
- Elevation: 511 m (1,677 ft)
- Time zone: UTC+01:00 (CET)
  - Summer (DST): UTC+02:00 (CEST)
- Post Code: 8255 Røkland

Lønsdal (Norwegian) or Luonosvágge (Lule Sami) is a village in Saltdal Municipality in Nordland county, Norway. The village is located in the Lønsdal valley, along the Lønselva river. The European route E06 highway and the Nordland Line railway both pass through the village. The village also has a train station on the Nordland Line, about halfway between Dunderland Station and Røkland Station.

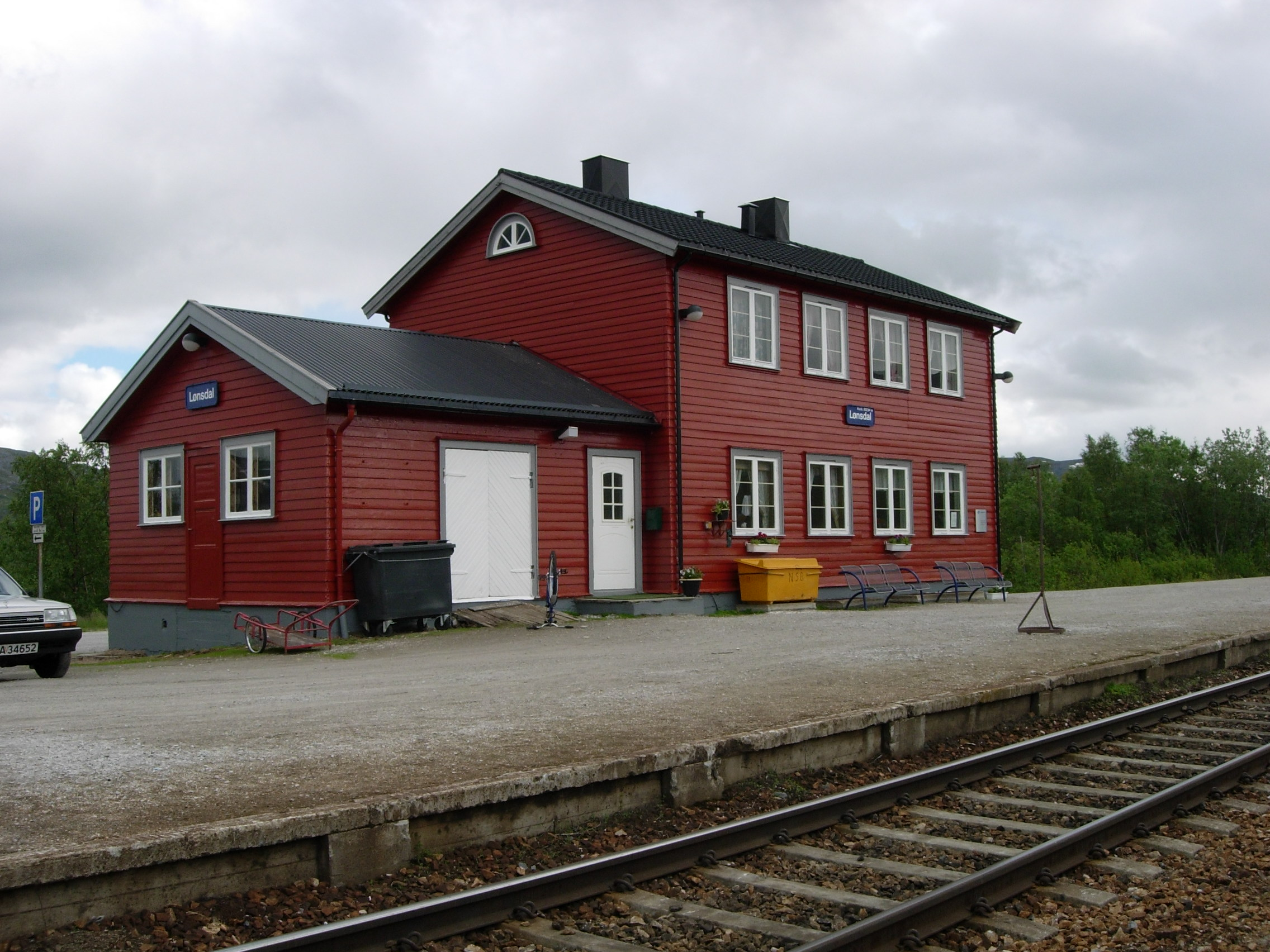
View of Lønsdal Station

The village lies just east of the lake Kjemåvatnet and the mountain Ørfjellet. Due to its proximity to Junkerdal National Park and Saltfjellet–Svartisen National Park, it is mostly a tourist village. There is a hotel and it is a starting point for many hiking tours.
