= Ørfjellet =

Mountain in Saltdal, Norway

Ørfjellet (Norwegian) Uvbágájsse (Lule Sami)
- Ølfjellet (Norwegian); Historic: Uvbagaisi or Uvbbagájsse (Lule Sami)
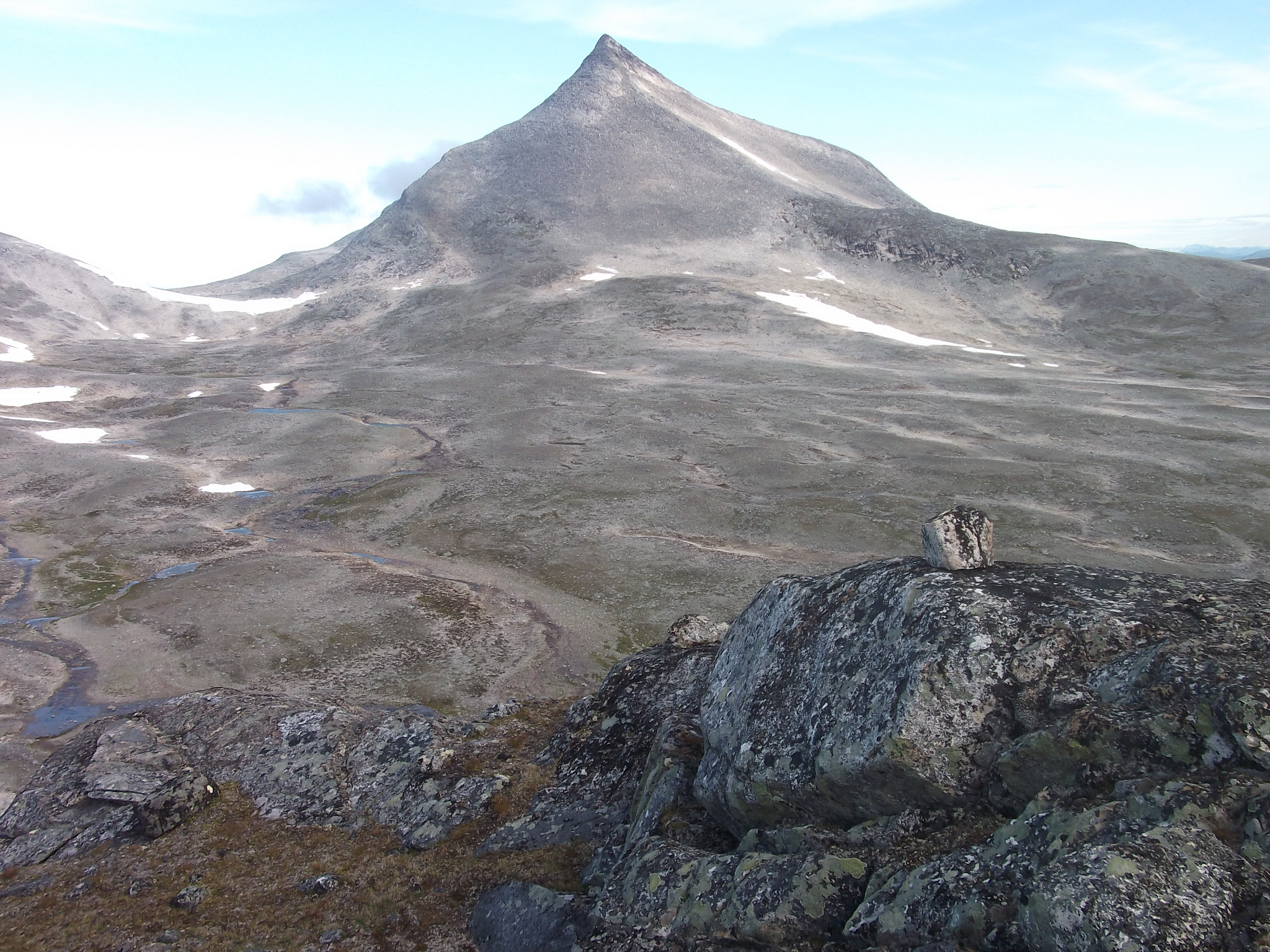
- Ørfjellet from Addjektinden ridge

Highest point
- Elevation: 1,751 m (5,745 ft)
- Prominence: 1,071 m (3,514 ft)
- Isolation: 46 km (29 mi) to Nuorttasávllo
- Coordinates: 66.7892°N 15.25174°E

Geography
- Interactive map of the mountain
- Location: Saltdal Municipality, Nordland, Norway
- Parent range: Saltfjellet
- Topo map(s): 2128 IV Junkerdal (north) and 2128 III Lønsdal (south)

Ørfjellet (Norwegian) or Uvbágájsse (Lule Sami) is the highest mountain in the Saltfjellet mountain range in Nordland county, Norway. It is located in Saltdal Municipality roughly halfway between the lakes Nordre Bjøllåvatnet and Kjemåvatnet. The village of Lønsdal lies about 1.6 kilometres (0.99 mi) southeast of the mountain.

The mountain has two peaks, the highest being 1,751 metres (5,745 ft). Approximately 1.5 kilometres (0.93 mi) north of the highest peak is the other peak with height of 1,651 metres (5,417 ft).

== Name ==
The first element is ør which means "dizzy" or "woozy" and the last element is the finite form of fjell which means "mountain".
