= Bjøllåga =

River in Nordland, Norway

Bjøllåga (Norwegian) Biellok (Lule Sami) Bjellåga (Norwegian) Biellok-jåhkå (Lule Sami)
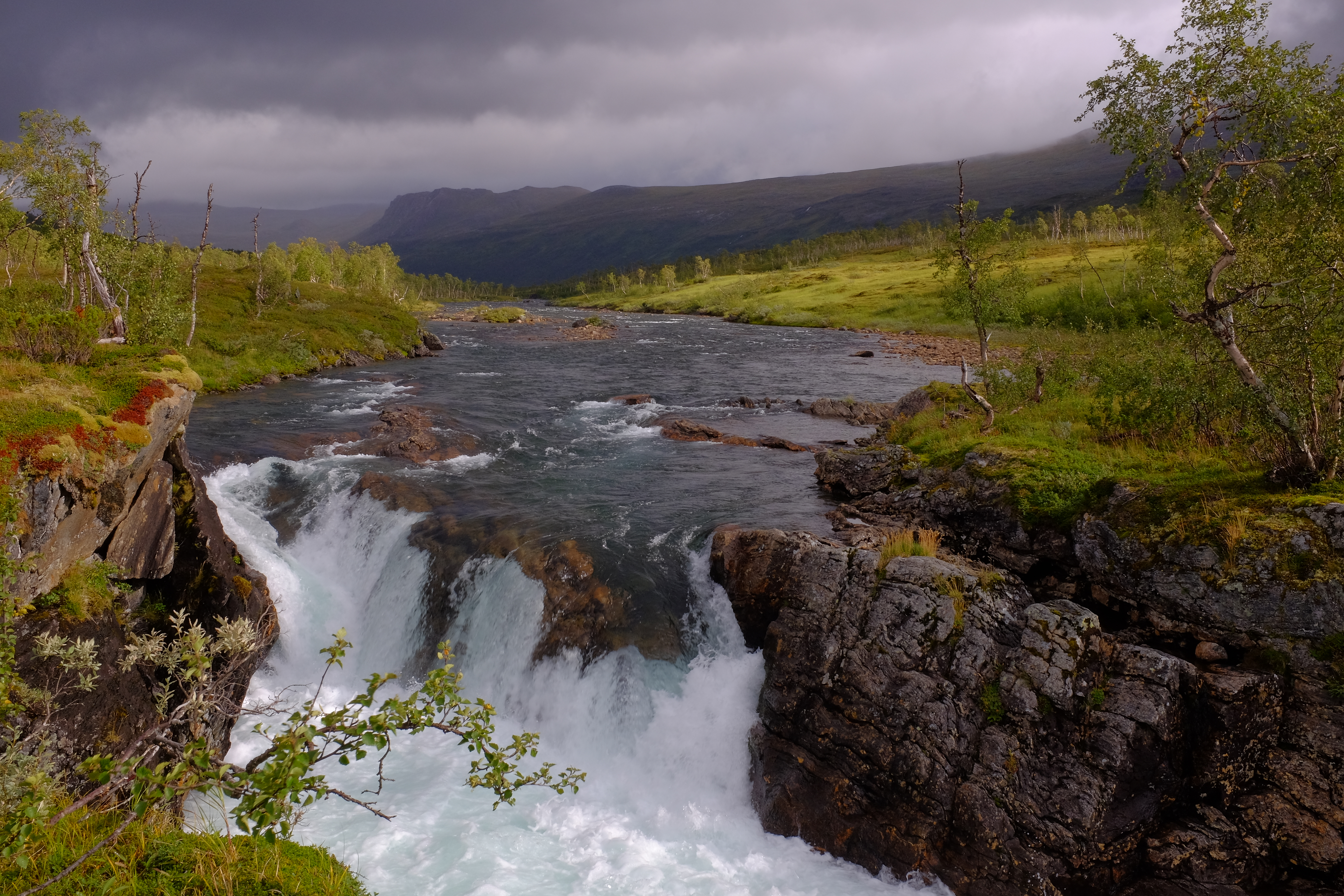
- View of the river

Location
- Country: Norway
- County: Nordland
- Municipalities: Rana, Saltdal

Physical characteristics
- Source: Lake Nordre Bjøllåvatnet
  - location: Saltdal Municipality, Norway
  - coordinates: 66.79522°N 15.0089°E
  - elevation: 706 metres (2,316 ft)
- Mouth: River Ranelva
  - location: Rana Municipality, Norway
  - coordinates: 66.50991°N 14.96887°E
  - elevation: 177 metres (581 ft)
- Length: 58.5 km (36.4 mi)
- Basin size: 375 km^{2} (145 sq mi)
- Discharge
  - average: 14.2 m^{3}/s (500 cu ft/s)

Basin features
- River system: Ranavassdraghet

Bjøllåga (Norwegian) or Biellok (Lule Sami) (lit. 'Bell River') is a river in Nordland county, Norway. It flows from the lake Nordre Bjøllåvatnet in Saltdal Municipality, through the valley of Bjøllådalen in the Saltfjellet mountains, within the Saltfjellet–Svartisen National Park, and joins with the river Ranelva in Rana Municipality.
