= Skånland =

Skånland may refer to:

== Places ==
- Skånland Municipality, a municipality in Troms county, Norway
- Evenskjer (sometimes referred to as Skånland), a village in Tjeldsund Municipality in Troms county, Norway
- Skånland Church, a church in Tjeldsund Municipality in Troms county, Norway
- Skånland Nature Reserve, a nature reserve in Bodø Municipality in Nordland county, Norway

== People ==
- Hermod Skånland (1925–2011), a Norwegian economist, civil servant, and Governor of the Central Bank of Norway

== Other ==
- Skånland og Omegn IF, a sports club based in Tjeldsund Municipality in Troms county, Norway
