= Fisklausvatnet =

Lake in Saltdal, Norway

Fisklausvatnet (Norwegian); Guoledisjávrre (Lule Sami)
- Fiskeløysvatnet (Norwegian); Historic: Guolehisjávri (Lule Sami)
- Interactive map of the lake
- Location: Saltdal Municipality, Nordland
- Coordinates: 67.0739°N 15.8380°E
- Basin countries: Norway
- Max. length: 2.5 kilometres (1.6 mi)
- Max. width: 2.3 kilometres (1.4 mi)
- Surface area: 2.28 km^{2} (0.88 sq mi)
- Shore length^{1}: 13.39 kilometres (8.32 mi)
- Surface elevation: 743 metres (2,438 ft)
- References: NVE
- ^{1} Shore length is not a well-defined measure.

Fisklausvatnet (Norwegian) or Guoledisjávrre (Lule Sami) is a lake that lies in Saltdal Municipality in Nordland county, Norway. The 2.28-square-kilometre (0.88 sq mi) lake is located inside Junkerdal National Park, about 2 kilometres (1.2 mi) south of the border with Fauske Municipality.

== See also ==
- List of lakes in Norway
- Geography of Norway
