= Langset (Saltdal) =

Village in Saltdal Municipality, Norway

Langset: Langset (Norwegian); Laŋsæhtta (Lule Sami)
- Village
- Interactive map of Langset
- Location within Nordland Location within Norway
- Coordinates: 67°08′12″N 15°27′06″E
- Country: Norway
- Region: Northern Norway
- County: Nordland
- District: Salten
- Municipality: Saltdal Municipality
- Elevation: 44 m (144 ft)
- Time zone: UTC+01:00 (CET)
  - Summer (DST): UTC+02:00 (CEST)
- Post Code: 8250 Rognan

Langset (Norwegian) or Laŋsæhtta (Lule Sami) is a village and basic statistical unit in the Nedre Saltdal ('Lower Saltdal') area of Saltdal Municipality in Nordland county, Norway. The area is located north of Rognan and Saksenvika and south of Setså on the east side of Saltdal Fjord (Norwegian: Saltdalsfjorden). The European route E6 highway and the Nordland Line railway both pass through the area.

During the Second World War the Blood Road was built through the area. It was constructed as a new segment of Norwegian National Road 50 between Rognan and Langset, where there was ferry service before the war.
