= Balvatnet =

Lake in Saltdal, Norway

Balvatnet (Norwegian) Bállávrre (Lule Sami)
- Historic: Bálljávrre or Ballavri (Lule Sami)
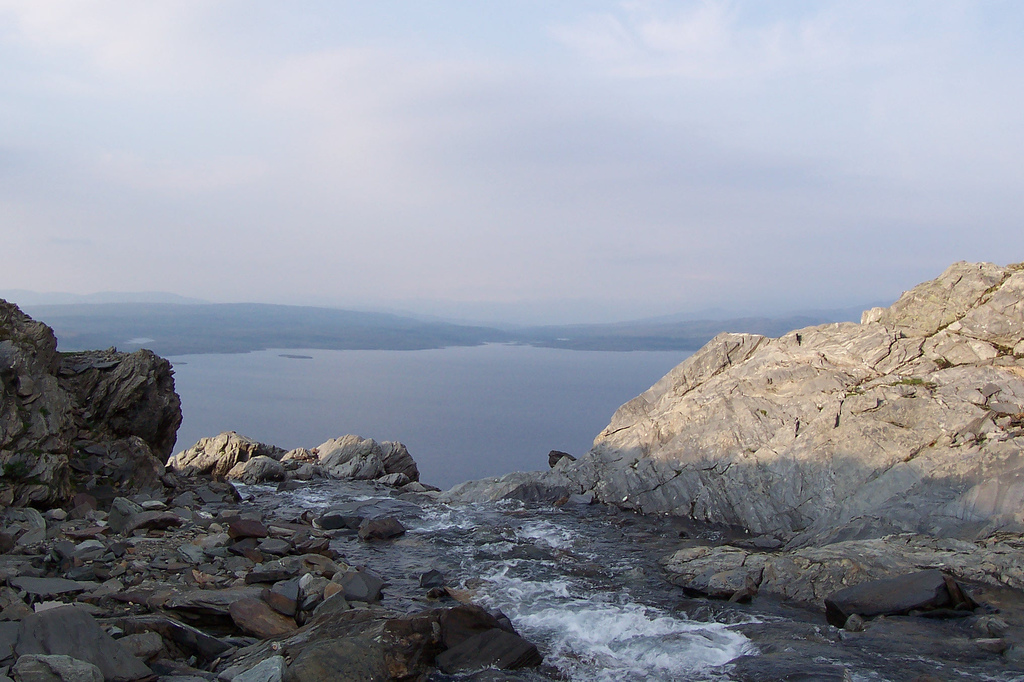
- Interactive map of the lake
- Location: Saltdal Municipality, Nordland
- Coordinates: 66.9456°N 15.8742°E
- Basin countries: Norway
- Max. length: 11 kilometres (6.8 mi)
- Max. width: 9 kilometres (5.6 mi)
- Surface area: 41.46 km^{2} (16.01 sq mi)
- Shore length^{1}: 54.32 kilometres (33.75 mi)
- Surface elevation: 597 metres (1,959 ft)
- References: NVE
- ^{1} Shore length is not a well-defined measure.

Balvatnet (Norwegian) or Bállávrre (Lule Sami) is a lake that lies in Saltdal Municipality in Nordland county, Norway. The 41.46-square-kilometre (16.01 sq mi) lake is located on the border of Junkerdal National Park, about 2 kilometres (1.2 mi) west of the border with Sweden. The lake is regulated for hydroelectric power at the Daja Hydroelectric Power Station 16 kilometres (9.9 mi) to the north in Sulitjelma.

== See also ==
- List of lakes in Norway
- Geography of Norway
