= Øvre Saltdal Church =

Church in Nordland, Norway

- Øvre Saltdal kirke
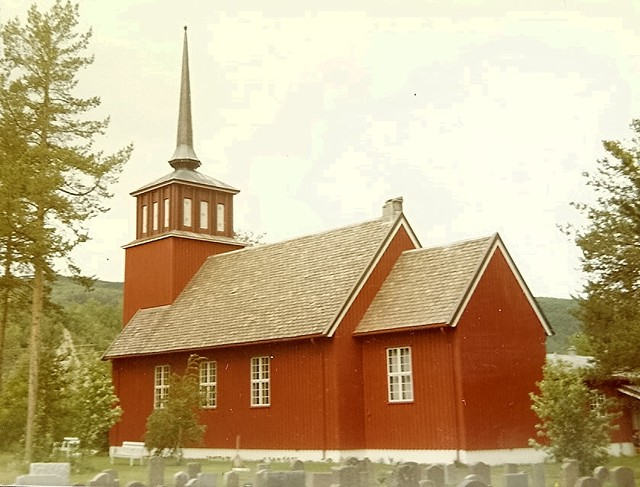
- View of the church
- Øvre Saltdal Church
- 66.9642401°N 15.31179383°E
- Location: Saltdal Municipality, Nordland
- Country: Norway
- Denomination: Church of Norway
- Churchmanship: Evangelical Lutheran

History
- Status: Parish church
- Founded: 1938
- Consecrated: 1938

Architecture
- Functional status: Active
- Architect: Andreas W. Nygaard
- Architectural type: Long church
- Completed: 1938 (88 years ago)

Specifications
- Capacity: 200
- Materials: Wood

Administration
- Diocese: Sør-Hålogaland
- Deanery: Salten prosti
- Parish: Saltdal
- Norwegian Cultural Heritage Site
- Type: Church
- Status: Listed
- ID: 85929

Øvre Saltdal Church (Norwegian: Øvre Saltdal kirke) is a parish church of the Church of Norway in Saltdal Municipality in Nordland county, Norway. It is located in the village of Røkland. It is one of two churches for the Saltdal parish which is part of the Salten prosti (deanery) in the Diocese of Sør-Hålogaland. The red, wooden church was built in a long church style in 1938 using plans drawn up by the architect Andreas W. Nygaard. The church seats about 200 people.

== History ==
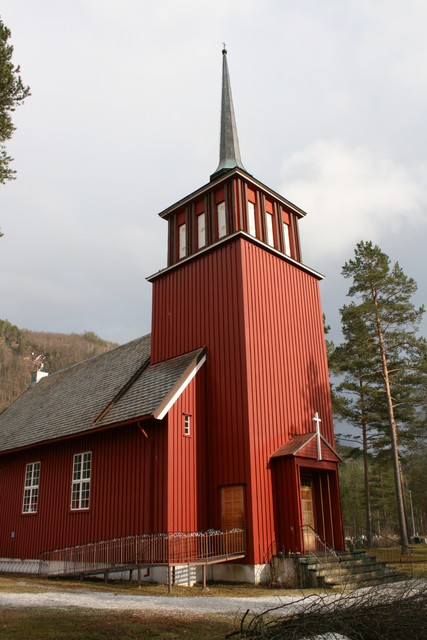

A royal resolution from 27 August 1937 authorized the construction of a new church in the upper Saltdal valley. The church was built the following year in 1938.

== See also ==
- List of churches in Sør-Hålogaland
