= Bjøllådalen =

Valley in Nordland, Norway

Bjøllådalen (Norwegian); Biellokvágge (Lule Sami)
- Bjellådalen (Norwegian); Biellokvaggi (Lule Sami)
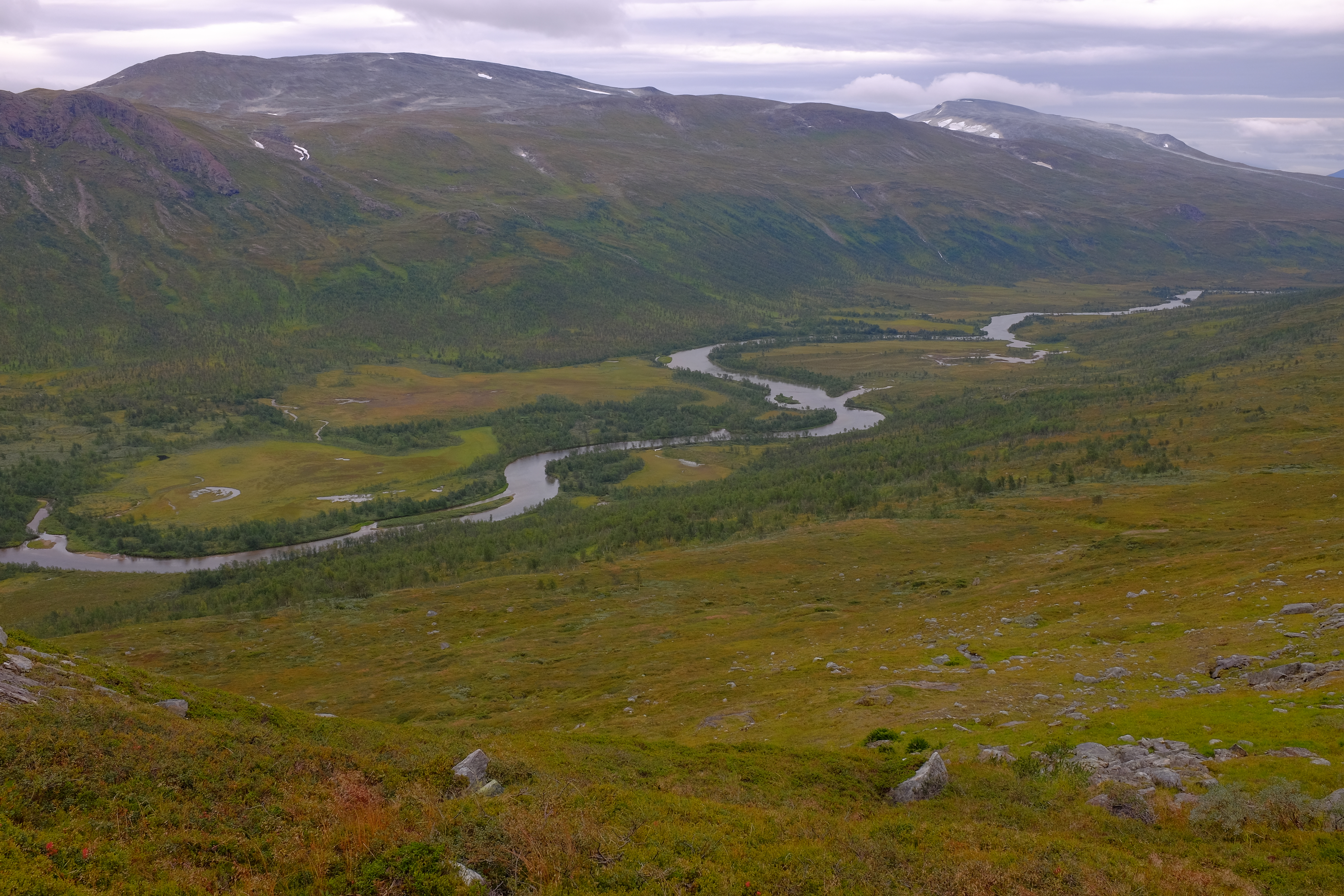
- View of the valley

Geology
- Type: River valley

Geography
- Location: Nordland, Norway
- Coordinates: 66.5575°N 15.0016°E
- Rivers: Bjøllåga

Location
- Interactive map of the valley

Bjøllådalen (Norwegian) or Biellokvágge (Lule Sami) is a valley in Rana Municipality in Nordland county, Norway. It is a side valley of the Dunderland Valley, and is located in the Saltfjellet mountains, within the Saltfjellet–Svartisen National Park. The river Bjøllåga flows through the valley. The old road across Saltfjellet passed through Bjøllådalen.
