= Arne Hjersing =

Norwegian painter (1860–1926)

Arne Hjersing (13 July 1860 – 17 December 1926) was a Norwegian painter.

He was born in Saltdal Municipality. He took his education at the Norwegian National Academy of Craft and Art Industry, at the Académie Julian and in Berlin. He made his debut exhibition at the annual National Autumn Exhibition of 1886, and participated regularly after that. His work is owned by the Oslo City Museum, among others.
