= Nordre Bjøllåvatnet =

Lake in Saltdal, Norway

Nordre Bjøllåvatnet (Norwegian) Bajep Ruovdajávrre (Lule Sami)
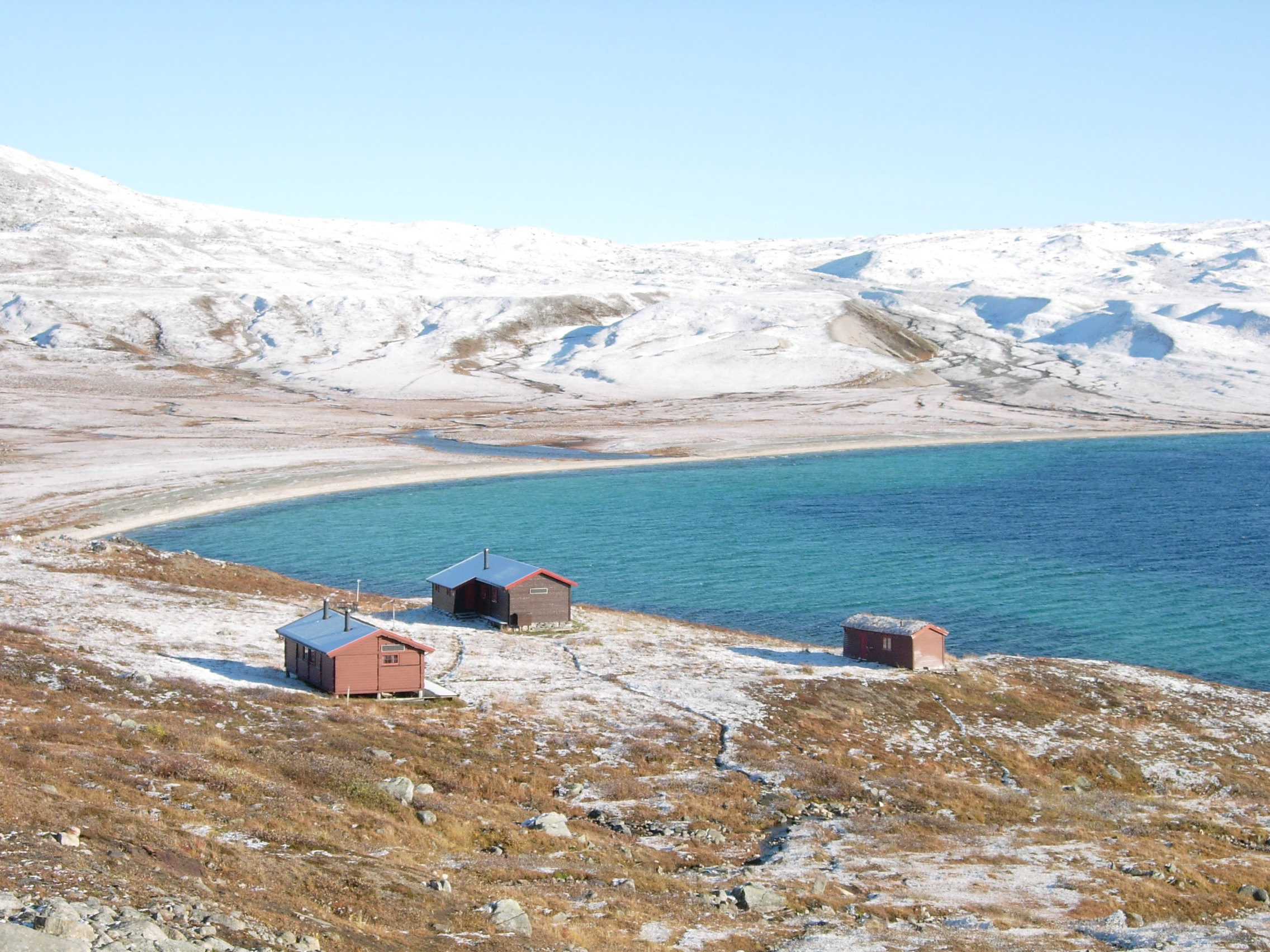
- Interactive map of the lake
- Location: Saltdal Municipality, Nordland
- Coordinates: 66.8268°N 15.0428°E
- Basin countries: Norway
- Max. length: 6.7 kilometres (4.2 mi)
- Max. width: 2 kilometres (1.2 mi)
- Surface area: 9.93 km^{2} (3.83 sq mi)
- Shore length^{1}: 16 kilometres (9.9 mi)
- Surface elevation: 706 metres (2,316 ft)
- References: NVE
- ^{1} Shore length is not a well-defined measure.

Nordre Bjøllåvatnet (Norwegian) or Bajep Ruovdajávrre (Lule Sami) is a lake that lies in Saltdal Municipality in Nordland county, Norway. The 9.93-square-kilometre (3.83 sq mi) lake is located inside Saltfjellet–Svartisen National Park, about 1 kilometre (0.62 mi) east of the border with Beiarn Municipality and north of the border with Rana Municipality. The lake flows out through the river Bjøllåga and ultimately into the river Ranelva.

== See also ==
- List of lakes in Norway
- Geography of Norway
