= Saltdal Church =

Church in Nordland, Norway

- Saltdal kirke
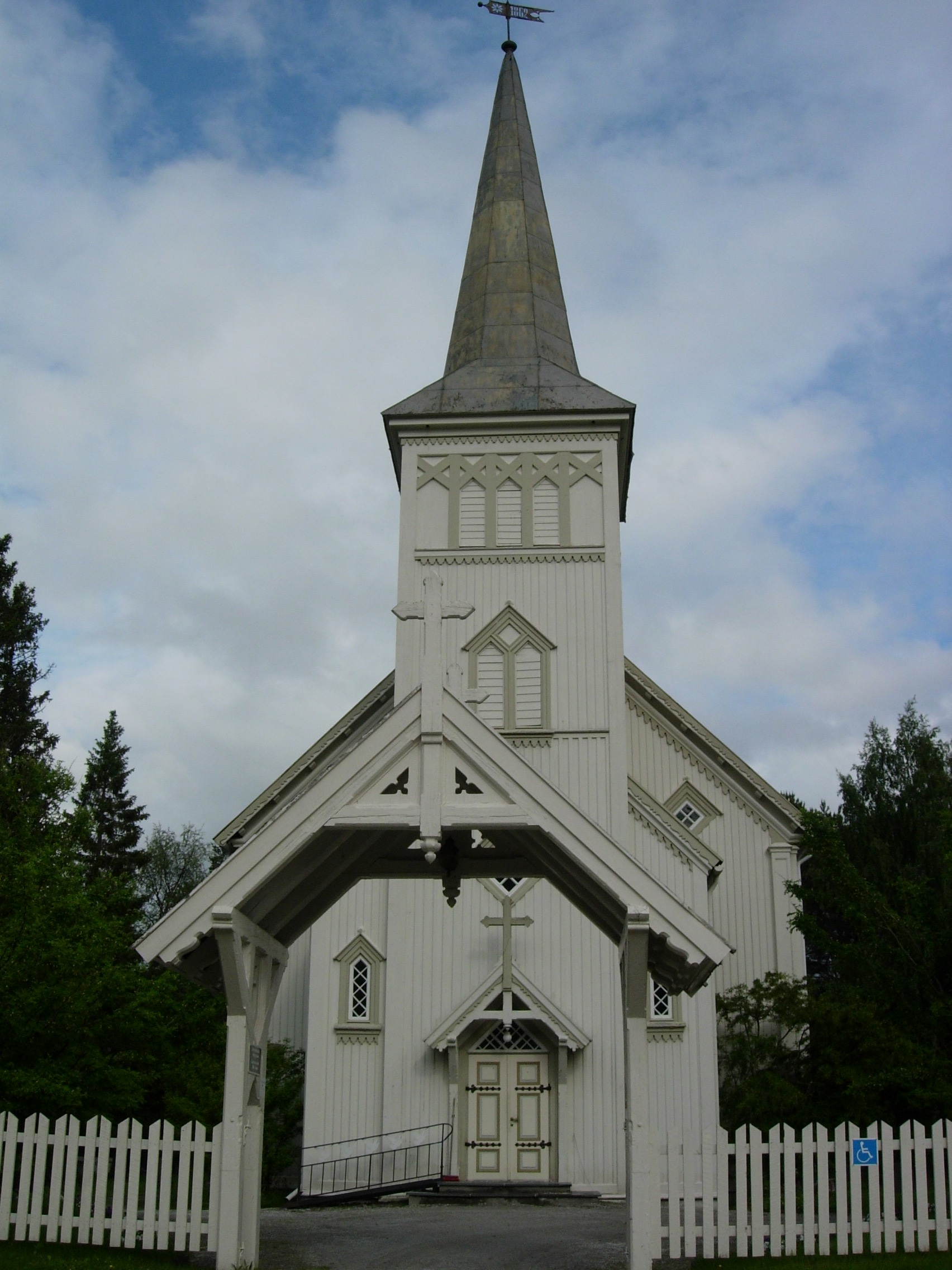
- View of the church
- Saltdal Church
- 67.10219613°N 15.40692239°E
- Location: Saltdal Municipality, Nordland
- Country: Norway
- Denomination: Church of Norway
- Churchmanship: Evangelical Lutheran

History
- Status: Parish church
- Founded: 16th century
- Consecrated: 1864

Architecture
- Functional status: Active
- Architect: Peter Høier Holtermann
- Architectural type: Long church
- Style: Neo-gothic
- Completed: 1864 (162 years ago)

Specifications
- Capacity: 460
- Materials: Wood

Administration
- Diocese: Sør-Hålogaland
- Deanery: Salten prosti
- Parish: Saltdal
- Norwegian Cultural Heritage Site
- Type: Church
- Status: Listed
- ID: 85364

Saltdal Church (Norwegian: Saltdal kirke) is a parish church of the Church of Norway in Saltdal Municipality in Nordland county, Norway. It is located in the village of Rognan. It is one of the churches for the Saltdal parish which is part of the Salten prosti (deanery) in the Diocese of Sør-Hålogaland. The white, wooden church was built in a long church style in 1864 using plans drawn up by the architect Peter Høier Holtermann. The church seats about 380 people.

== History ==
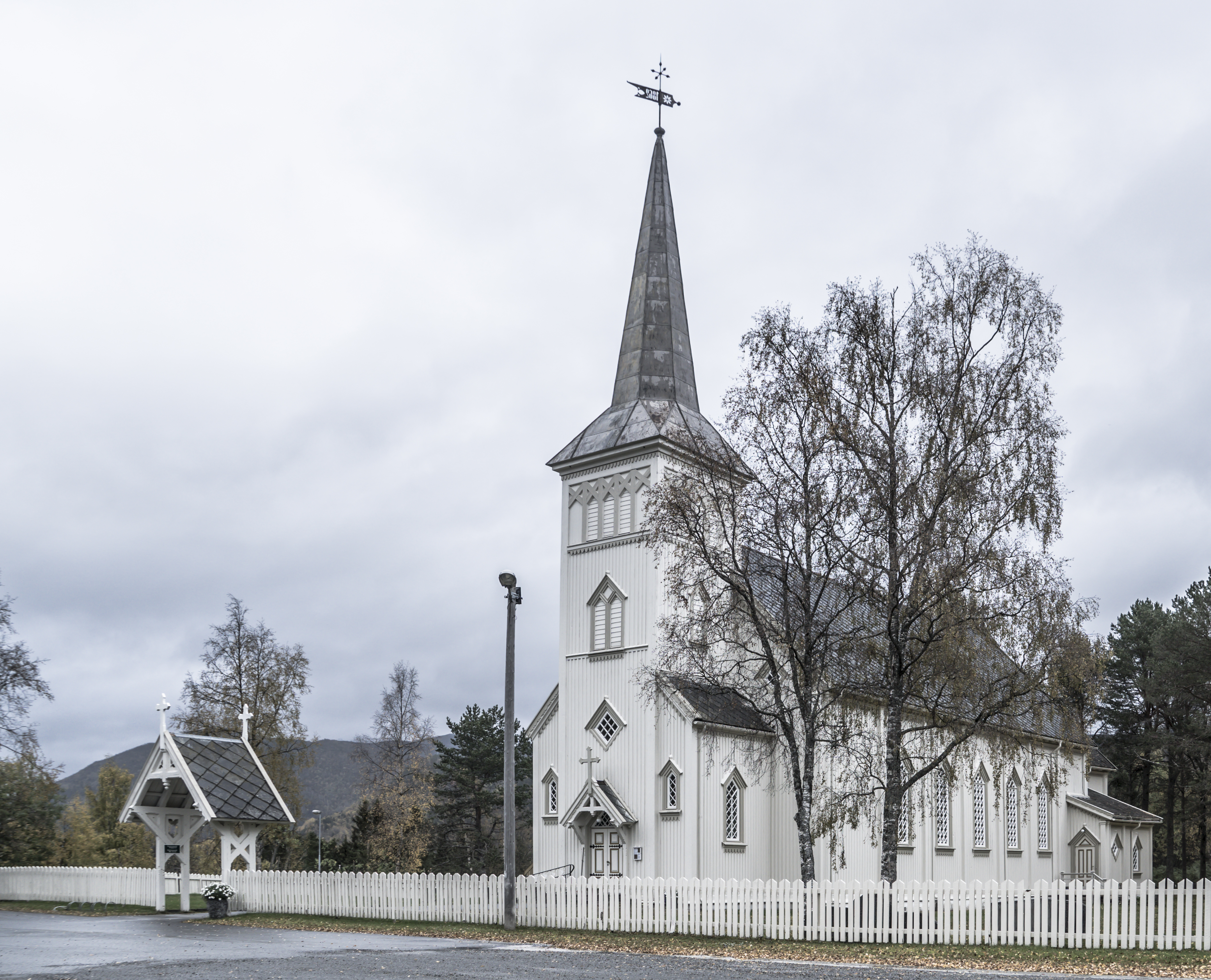

The earliest existing historical records of the church date back to the year 1612, but the church was likely founded in the Late Middle Ages. The church was located at the Saltnes farm, about 1 kilometre (0.62 mi) to the southeast of the present location of the church. The parish priest in 1612 was Morten Olsen and he served the Saltdal parish until his death in 1647. In 1656, the old church was torn down and a new church was built on the same site. On 8 June 1770, Saltdal became its own prestegjeld. In 1774-1778 the church was thoroughly renovated and enlarged by converting it to a cruciform design (some sources say that it was completely torn down and rebuilt rather than simply renovated).

In 1814, this church served as an election church (Norwegian: valgkirke). Together with more than 300 other parish churches across Norway, it was a polling station for elections to the 1814 Norwegian Constituent Assembly which wrote the Constitution of Norway. This was Norway's first national elections. Each church parish was a constituency that elected people called "electors" who later met together in each county to elect the representatives for the assembly that was to meet at Eidsvoll Manor later that year.

In 1864, a new church was constructed to replace the old one. A new church site was chosen on the west side of the river, located in a more central part of the main village of Rognan. The new church had a tower in the west and a small sacristy on the south side between the nave and chancel. The old church was disassembled and moved to the village of Evenskjer in the Skånland area of Trondenes Municipality where it was rebuilt as "Skånland Church".

== See also ==
- List of churches in Sør-Hålogaland
