= Saltdal Fjord =

Fjord in Nordland, Norway

- Saltdalsfjorden (Norwegian); Sálatvuodna (Lule Sami)
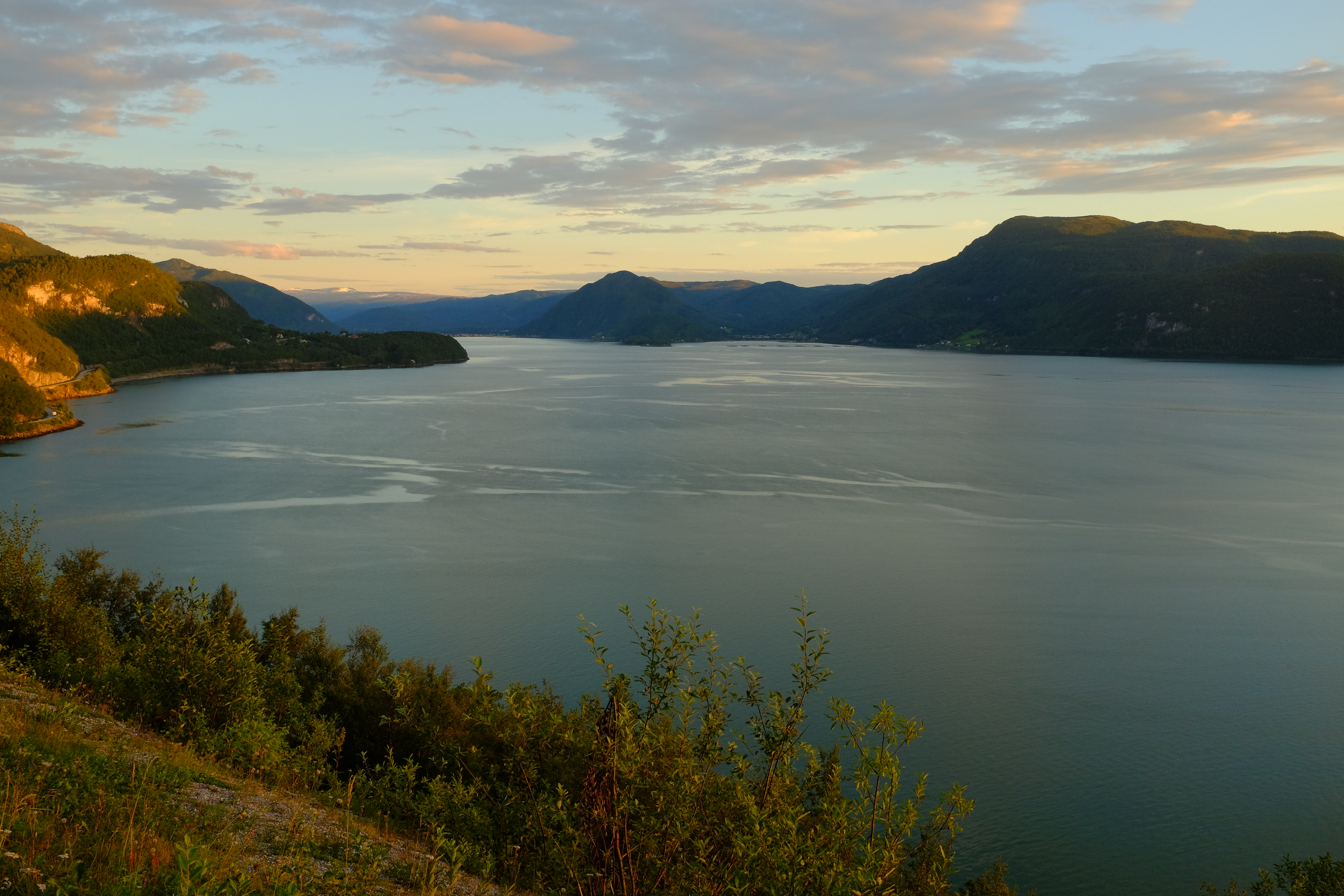
- Saltdal Fjord seen from the east side looking south. European route E6 runs along the fjord at left. Parts of Rognan and the Rognan shoreline, where boat building has taken place for a long time, lie slightly left of center.
- Interactive map of the fjord
- Location: Nordland county, Norway
- Coordinates: 67.1324°N 15.3976°E
- Type: Fjord
- Basin countries: Norway
- Max. length: 11 kilometres (6.8 mi)
- Max. width: 3 kilometres (1.9 mi)
- Settlements: Rognan

Saltdal Fjord (Norwegian: Saltdalsfjorden; Lule Sami: Sálatvuodna) is a fjord arm of Skjerstadfjorden in Saltdal Municipality in Nordland county, Norway. The fjord extends 11 kilometers (6.8 mi) south to the village of Rognan at the bottom of the fjord.

The inlet of the fjord lies between Hjelbunes, a headland to the west, and Langruodden, a promontory to the east. The village of Setså lies on the east side of the fjord, slightly inland from the shore. On the west lies the hamlet of Vik inside the bay formed by Tangodden, a peninsula jutting north into the fjord. Rognan lies at the foot of the fjord, and this is also where the Saltdal River flows into the fjord. West of the river's mouth lie the hamlets of Saksenvik and Botn.

The Nordland Line railway and the European route E6 highway both run along the entire east side of the fjord, and Norwegian County Road 515 runs along the west side.
