= Saksenvika =

Village in Saltdal Municipality, Norway

Saksenvika (Norwegian); Sáksavijkka (Lule Sami)
- Village
- Interactive map of: Saksenvika (Norwegian); Sáksavijkka (Lule Sami)
- Location within Nordland Location within Norway
- Coordinates: 67°06′28″N 15°27′10″E
- Country: Norway
- Region: Northern Norway
- County: Nordland
- District: Salten
- Municipality: Saltdal Municipality
- Elevation: 22 m (72 ft)
- Time zone: UTC+01:00 (CET)
  - Summer (DST): UTC+02:00 (CEST)
- Post Code: 8250 Rognan

Saksenvik (Norwegian) or Sáksavijkka (Lule Sami) is a village and basic statistical unit in the Nedre Saltdal area of Saltdal Municipality in Nordland county, Norway. European route E6 passes through Saksenvika and the nearby Saksenvik Tunnel on its way to Langset to the north. Since 2012, the Saksenvik Hydroelectric Power Station has produced electricity in the region.

Saksenvika is known for several quernstone quarries from earlier times, including on the nearby mountain Vassliheia at an elevation of 465 meters (1,526 ft). Quernstone production in Saltdal has been documented since the Middle Ages; in 1432 Aslak Bolt's cadastre recorded a quarry at Setså. Such old written sources do not exist for Saksenvika, and it has been suggested that in earlier times quernstones from Saksenvika were delivered to Setså as a central purchasing and shipping station.

A heritage project is being funded in cooperation between landowners and Saltdal Municipality, and it has documented quarries for tourists with information boards, signage, and picnic areas.
