= Røkland =

Village in Saltdal Municipality, Norway

Røkland (Norwegian); Rævkka (Lule Sami)
- Village
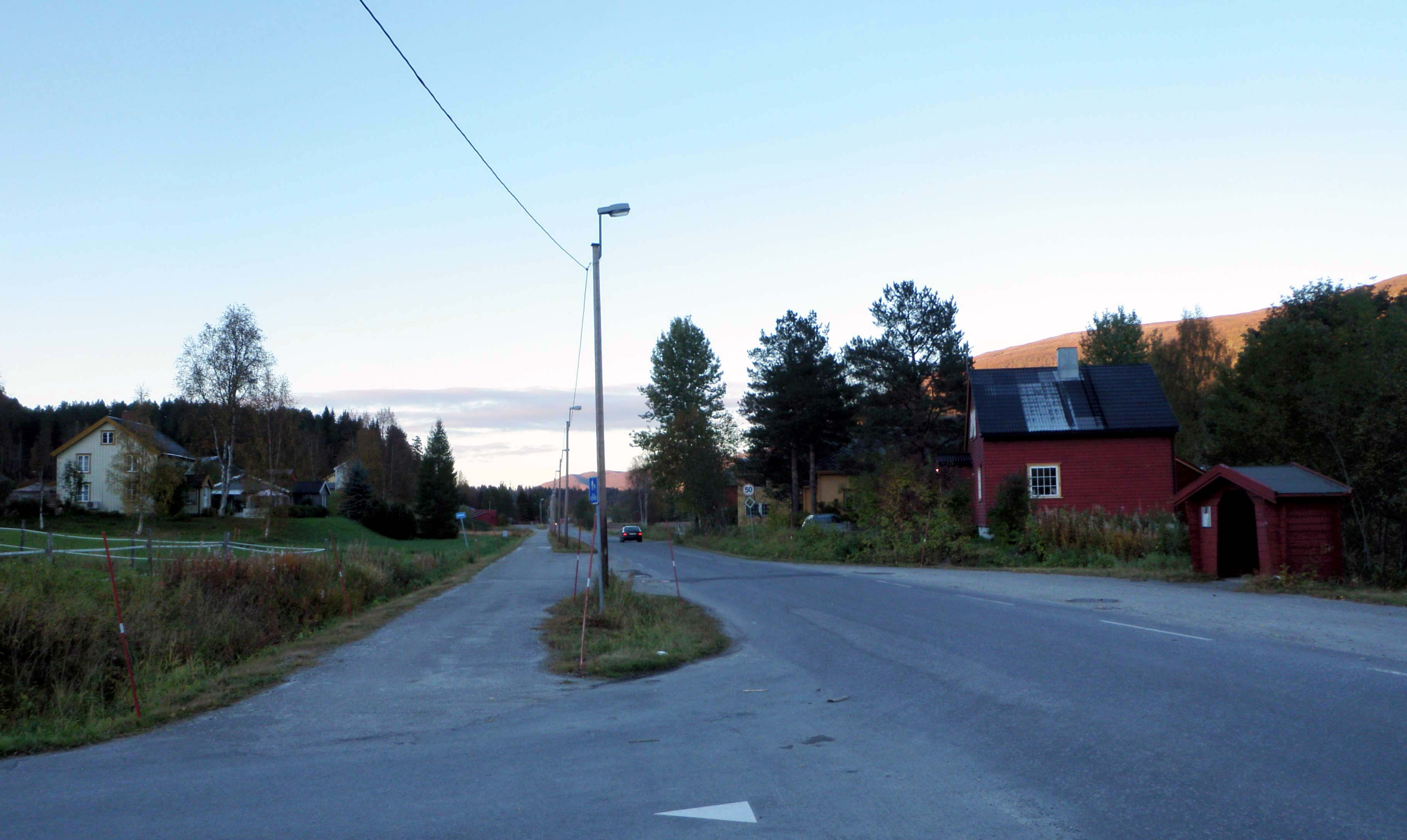
- View of the village
- Interactive map of: Røkland (Norwegian); Rævkka (Lule Sami)
- Location within Nordland Location within Norway
- Coordinates: 66.9861°N 15.3179°E
- Country: Norway
- Region: Northern Norway
- County: Nordland
- District: Salten
- Municipality: Saltdal Municipality

Area
  - Total: 1.04 km^{2} (0.40 sq mi)
- Elevation: 25 m (82 ft)

Population (2012)
  - Total: 446
  - Density: 429/km^{2} (1,110/sq mi)
- Time zone: UTC+01:00 (CET)
  - Summer (DST): UTC+02:00 (CEST)
- Post Code: 8255 Røkland

Røkland (Norwegian) or Rævkka (Lule Sami) is a village in Saltdal Municipality in Nordland county, Norway. The village is located along the Saltdalselva river about 15 kilometres (9.3 mi) south of the municipal centre of Rognan. European route E06 and the Nordland Line both pass through the village. Røkland Station is a train station along the Nordland Line. Øvre Saltdal Church is located in Røkland.

The 1.04-square-kilometre (260-acre) village had a population (2012) of 446 and a population density of 429 inhabitants per square kilometre (1,110/sq mi). Since 2012, the population and area data for this village area has not been separately tracked by Statistics Norway.

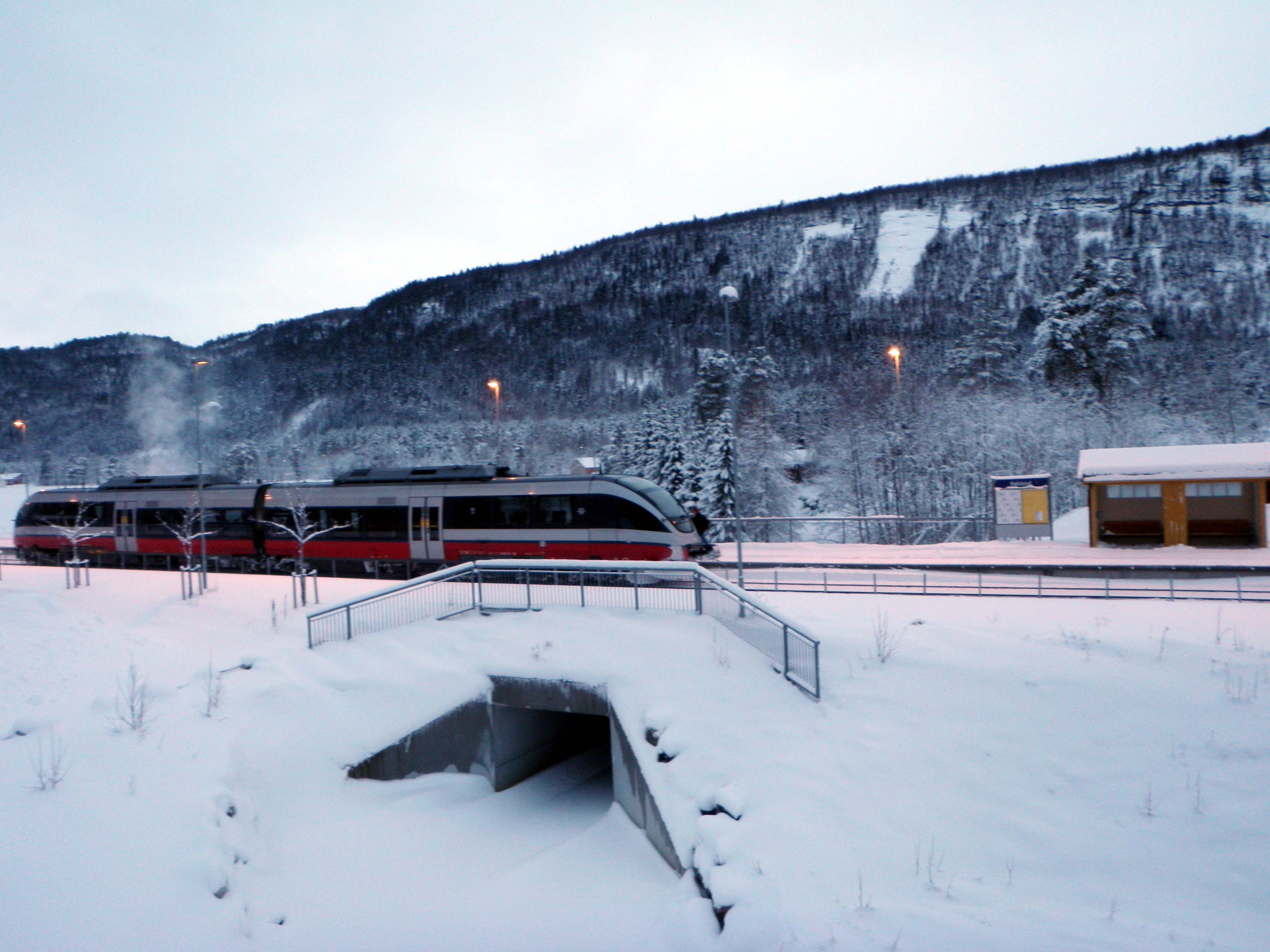
NSB Class 93 train at Røkland Station
