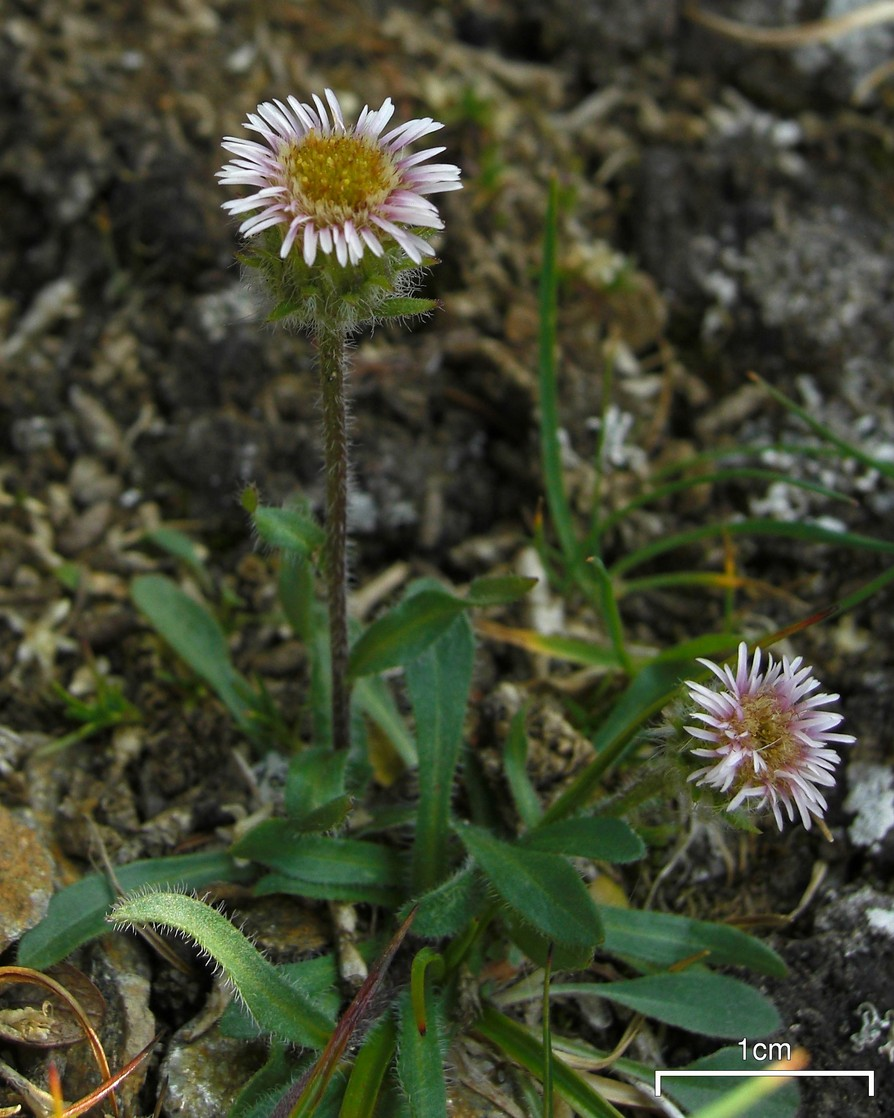

Conservation status
- Secure (NatureServe)

Scientific classification
- Kingdom: Plantae
- Clade: Tracheophytes
- Clade: Angiosperms
- Clade: Eudicots
- Clade: Asterids
- Order: Asterales
- Family: Asteraceae
- Genus: Erigeron
- Species: E. humilis

Binomial name
- Erigeron humilis Graham 1828 not Spreng. ex DC. 1836

Synonyms
- Synonymy: Erigeron humile Graham; Erigeron pulchellus var. unalaschkensis DC.; Erigeron unalaschkensis (DC.) Vierh.; Erigeron unalaschkensis var. grandis Böcher; Erigeron uniflorus f. pallidus (Cronquist) B.Boivin; Erigeron uniflorus var. unalaschkensis (DC.) Ostenf.

= Erigeron humilis =

Species of flowering plant

Erigeron humilis is an arctic and alpine species of flowering plants in the family Asteraceae known as the Arctic alpine fleabane or low fleabane. It is widespread across the colder regions of the Northern Hemisphere. In North America, it has been found in Alaska, much of Canada, Greenland, and the Rocky Mountains of the United States as far south as Colorado. In Eurasia, it has been found in Scandinavia (including Iceland), and the Chukotka region in the Russian Far East.

Erigeron humilis is a perennial herb up to 25 centimeters (10 inches) tall, spreading by means of underground rhizomes. Each plant generally produces only one flower head, with sometimes as many as 150 blue or purple ray florets surrounding numerous yellow disc florets.
