= Skånland Church =

- Skånland kirke
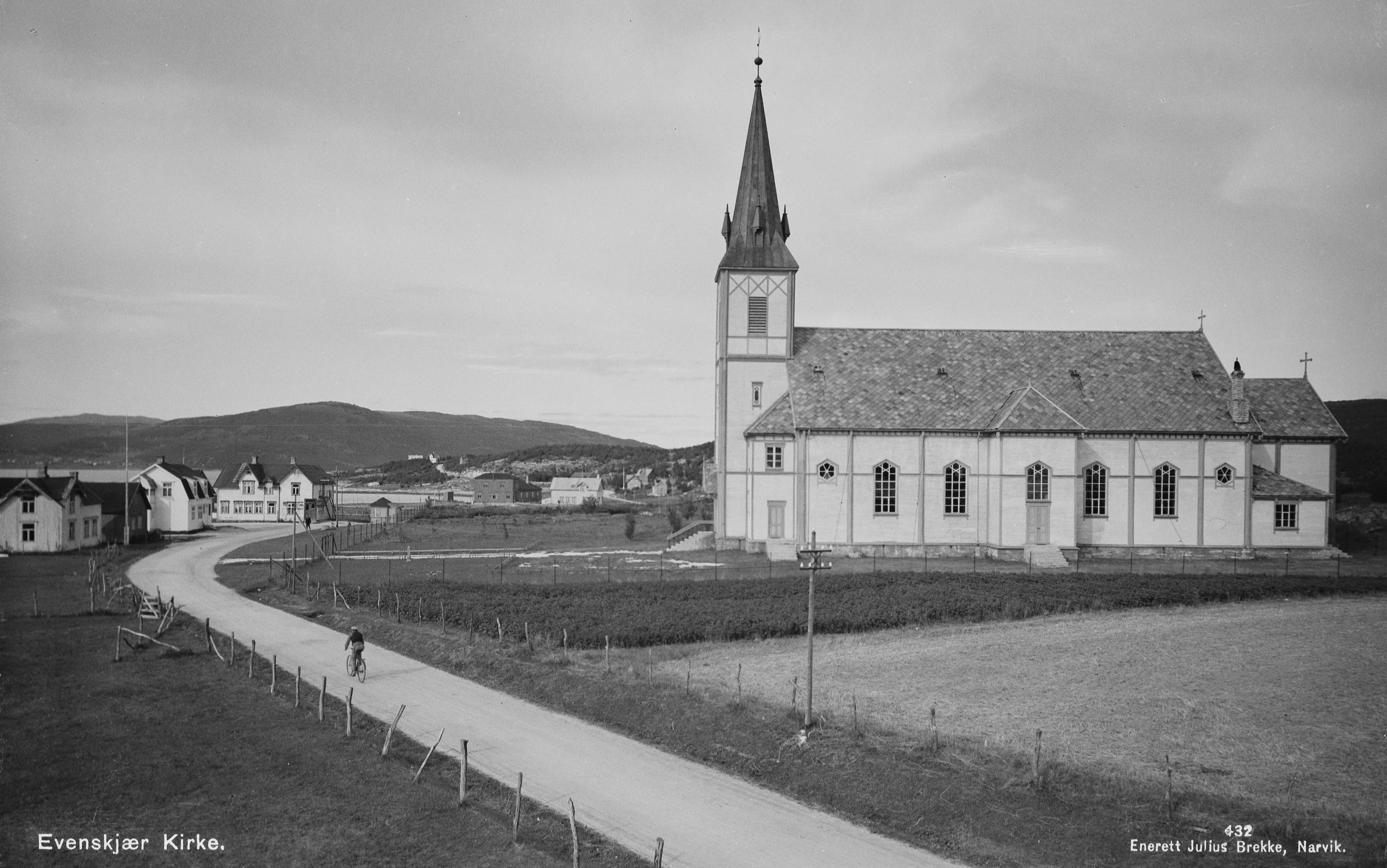
- View of the church
- Skånland Church
- 68.582402°N 16.573595°E
- Location: Tjeldsund Municipality, Troms
- Country: Norway
- Denomination: Church of Norway
- Churchmanship: Evangelical Lutheran

History
- Status: Parish church
- Founded: 1867
- Consecrated: 1901

Architecture
- Functional status: Active
- Architect: Carl J. Bergstrøm
- Architectural type: Long church
- Completed: 1901 (125 years ago)

Specifications
- Capacity: 400
- Materials: Wood

Administration
- Diocese: Nord-Hålogaland
- Deanery: Trondenes prosti
- Parish: Skånland
- Norwegian Cultural Heritage Site
- Type: Church
- Status: Not protected
- ID: 85490

Skånland Church (Norwegian: Skånland kirke) is a parish church of the Church of Norway in Tjeldsund Municipality in Troms county, Norway. It is located in the village of Evenskjer. It is the church for the Skånland parish which is part of the Trondenes prosti (deanery) in the Diocese of Nord-Hålogaland. The white, wooden church was built in a long church basilica style in 1901 using plans drawn up by the architect Carl J. Bergstrøm. The church seats about 400 people.

== History ==
The first church built in Evenskjer was constructed in 1867 when it was still a part of the old Trondenes Municipality. The municipality bought the old Saltdal Church, took it apart, moved it to Evenskjer, and rebuilt it here to serve the people of the Skånland portion of the municipality. The new building was consecrate in September 1867. The area grew in population quite rapidly and by 1896, the church was too small for the parish. It was decided to build a new church slightly south of the old church. After the new church was completed in 1901, there was talk about moving the old church to Tovik to use as a new Tovik Church, however it was decided against this because of the poor condition of the old building. Instead, the old church was torn down and its materials were sold.

== See also ==
- List of churches in Nord-Hålogaland
