= Kjemåvatnet =

Lake in Saltdal, Norway

Kjemåvatnet (Norwegian) Giebbnejávrre (Lule Sami)
- Historic: Giebdnijavri (Lule Sami)
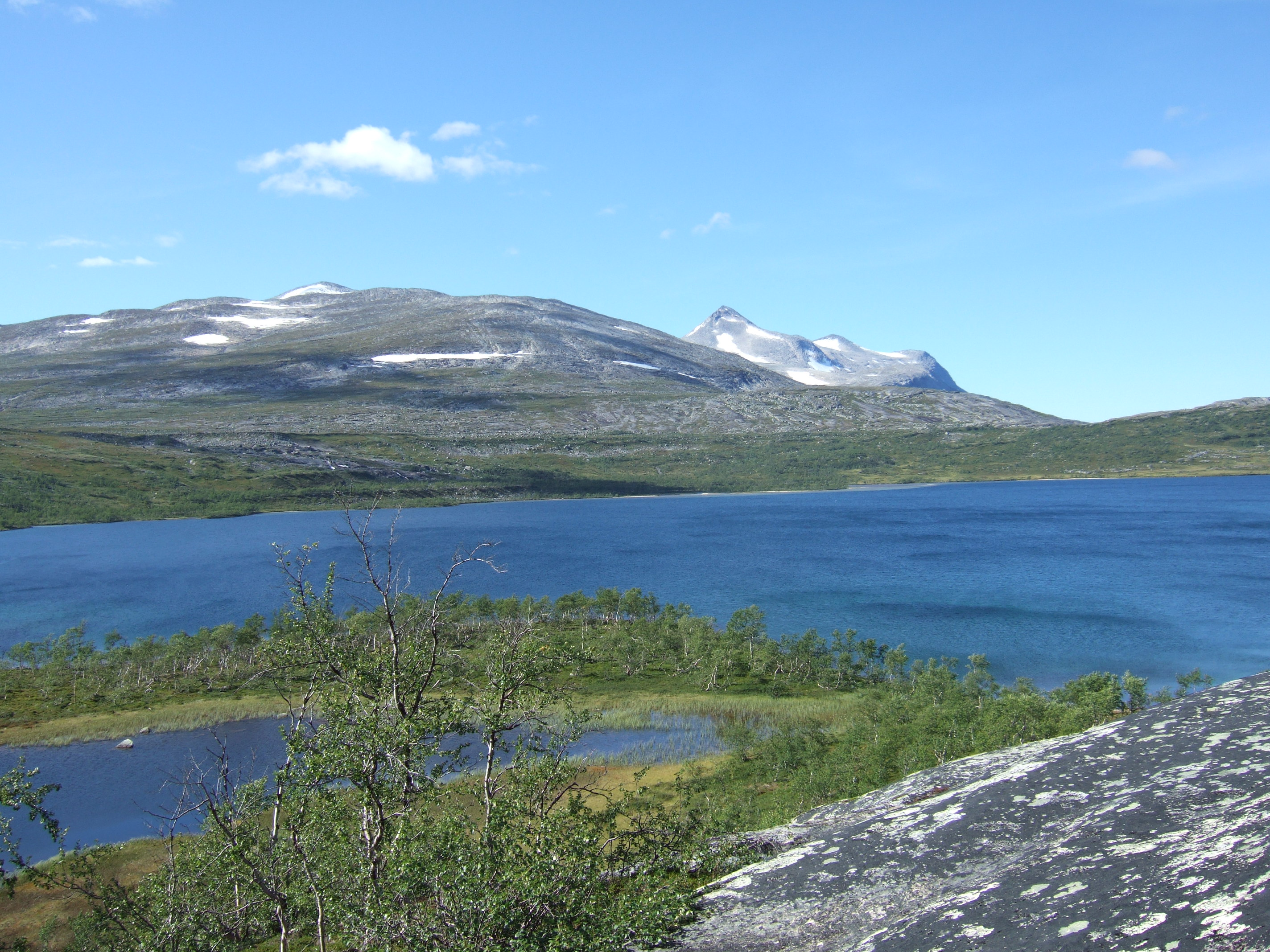
- Interactive map of the lake
- Location: Saltdal Municipality, Nordland
- Coordinates: 66.7469°N 15.4024°E
- Basin countries: Norway
- Max. length: 3.2 kilometres (2.0 mi)
- Max. width: 1.7 kilometres (1.1 mi)
- Surface area: 2.64 km^{2} (1.02 sq mi)
- Shore length^{1}: 9.49 kilometres (5.90 mi)
- Surface elevation: 626 metres (2,054 ft)
- References: NVE
- ^{1} Shore length is not a well-defined measure.

Kjemåvatnet (Norwegian) or Giebbnejávrre (Lule Sami) is a lake that lies in Saltdal Municipality in Nordland county, Norway. The 2.64-square-kilometre (1.02 sq mi) lake lies about 2 kilometres (1.2 mi) west of the village of Lønsdal.

== See also ==
- List of lakes in Norway
- Geography of Norway
