= Junkerdal National Park =

National park in Nordland, Norway

- IUCN category II (national park)
- Interactive map of Junkerdal National Park
- Location: Nordland, Norway
- Nearest city: Fauske
- Coordinates: 66°53′N 15°48′E
- Area: 682 square kilometres (263 sq mi)
- Established: 9 January 2004
- Governing body: Directorate for Nature Management

Junkerdal National Park (Norwegian: Junkerdal nasjonalpark) is a national park in Saltdal Municipality and Fauske Municipality in Nordland county, Norway, along its border with Sweden. The 682-square-kilometre (263 sq mi) park opened in 2004. It borders the Junkerdalsura nature reserve.

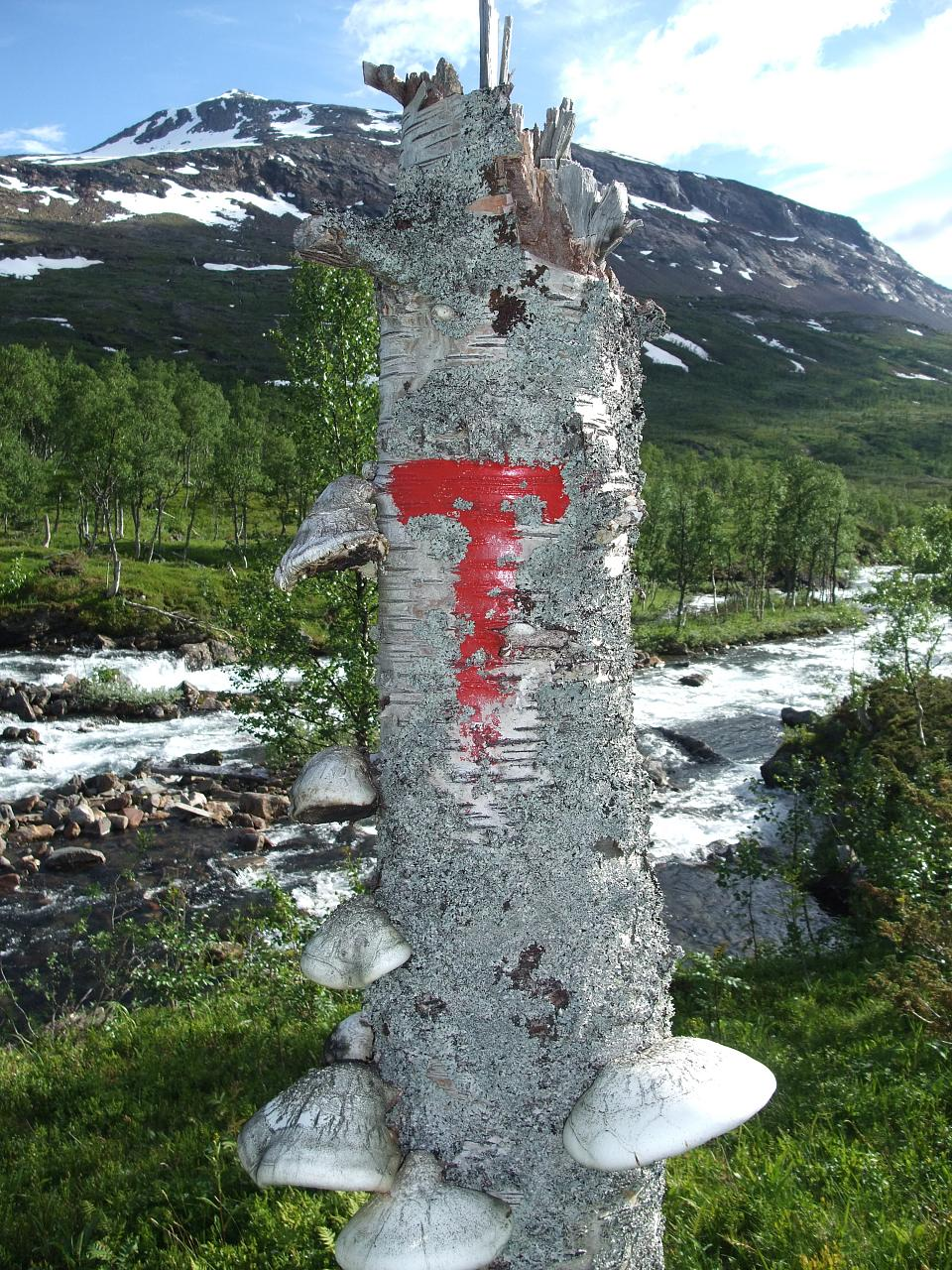
Marked hiking route in Junkerdal

== Nature ==
The park is known for a varied flora. Some mountains and highlands have a large number of arctic-alpine species of plants. The lower altitudes in the park are forested. Several of the plant species are generally rare, such as the white Arctic mountain heather (Cassiope tetragona). The white mountain saxifrage (Saxifraga paniculata) is found in only three places in Norway, and it is most widely distributed in Junkerdal National Park. Many of the plants in this park are normally only found further north, or on other continents entirely. Some of the specialized plants are bullrush sedge (Carex scirpoidea), snow fleabane (Erigeron humilis) and alpine arnica (Arnica angustifolia), all of which are at their southernmost limit here. Other rare plants found in the national park are Arctic bellflower (Campanula uniflora), upright lousewort (Pedicularis flammea) and hairy lousewort (Pedicularis hirsuta).

There are wolverines, lynx, and brown bears that live in the park. Moose and reindeer are both common in the area. A wide variety of rare and threatened wetland birds also nest inside the national park, among them include the gerfalcon, golden eagle, red-throated loon, Arctic loon, and long-tailed duck.

== Name ==
The first element is junker means "nobleman". The valley is allegedly named after Preben von Ahnen (1606-1675), called "the junker", who went through the valley in 1658 to raid and destroy the Swedish Nasa silver mine. The last element is dal which means "valley" or "dale".

== Media gallery ==
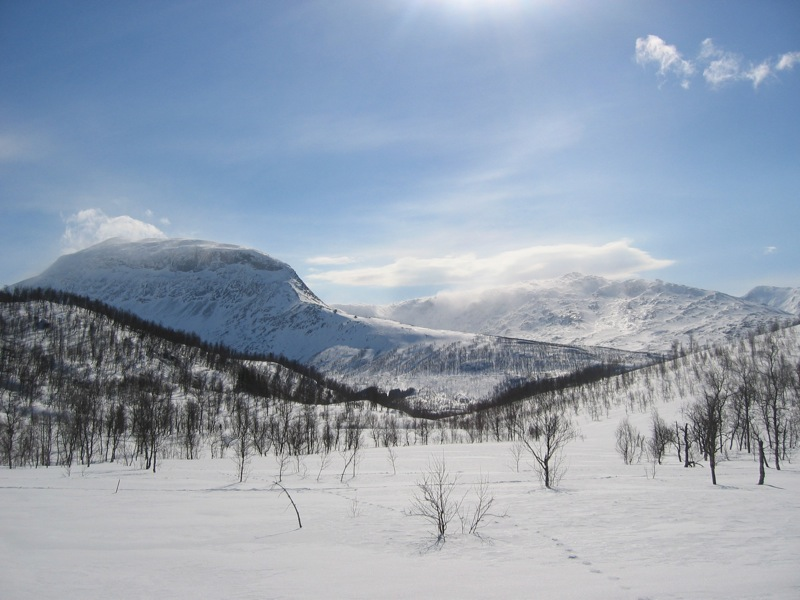
Sjurfjellet, February 2007

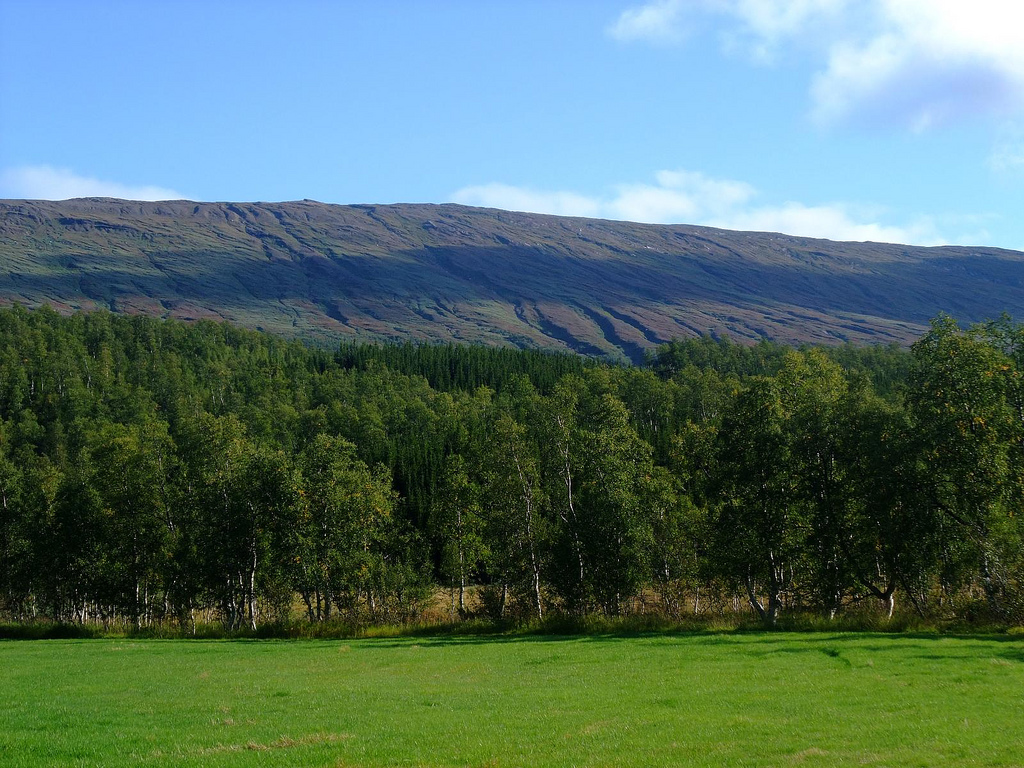
View towards Storfjellet mountain

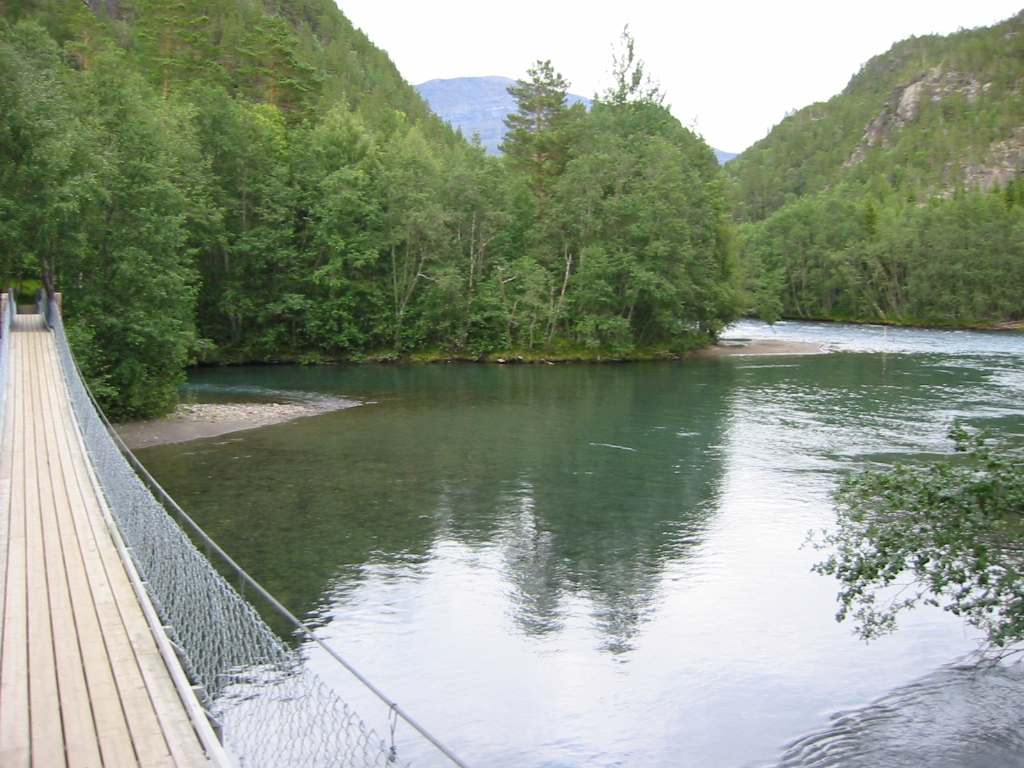
View in the park

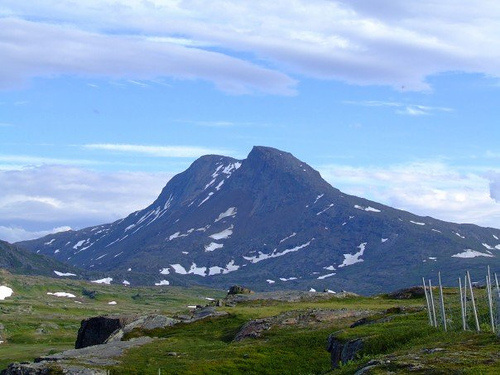
Solvagtind mountain

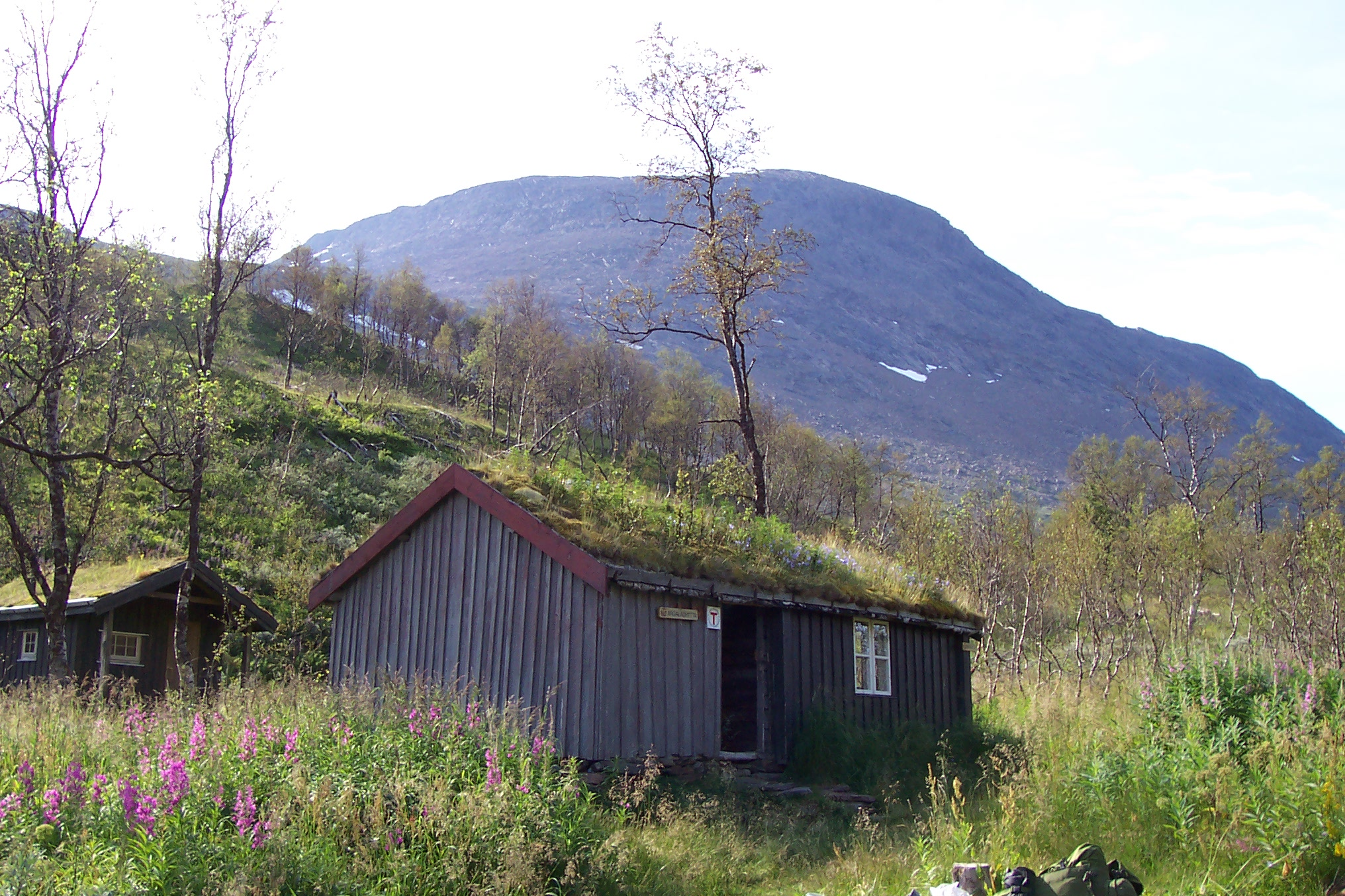
Hut inside the park

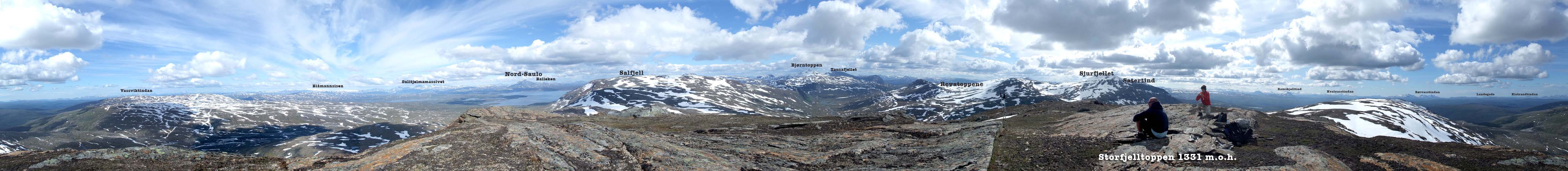
Panorama from Storfjelltoppen mt
