= Saltdal Municipality =

Municipality in Nordland, Norway

Saltdal Municipality Saltdal kommune
- Municipality
- Saltdalen herred (historic name)
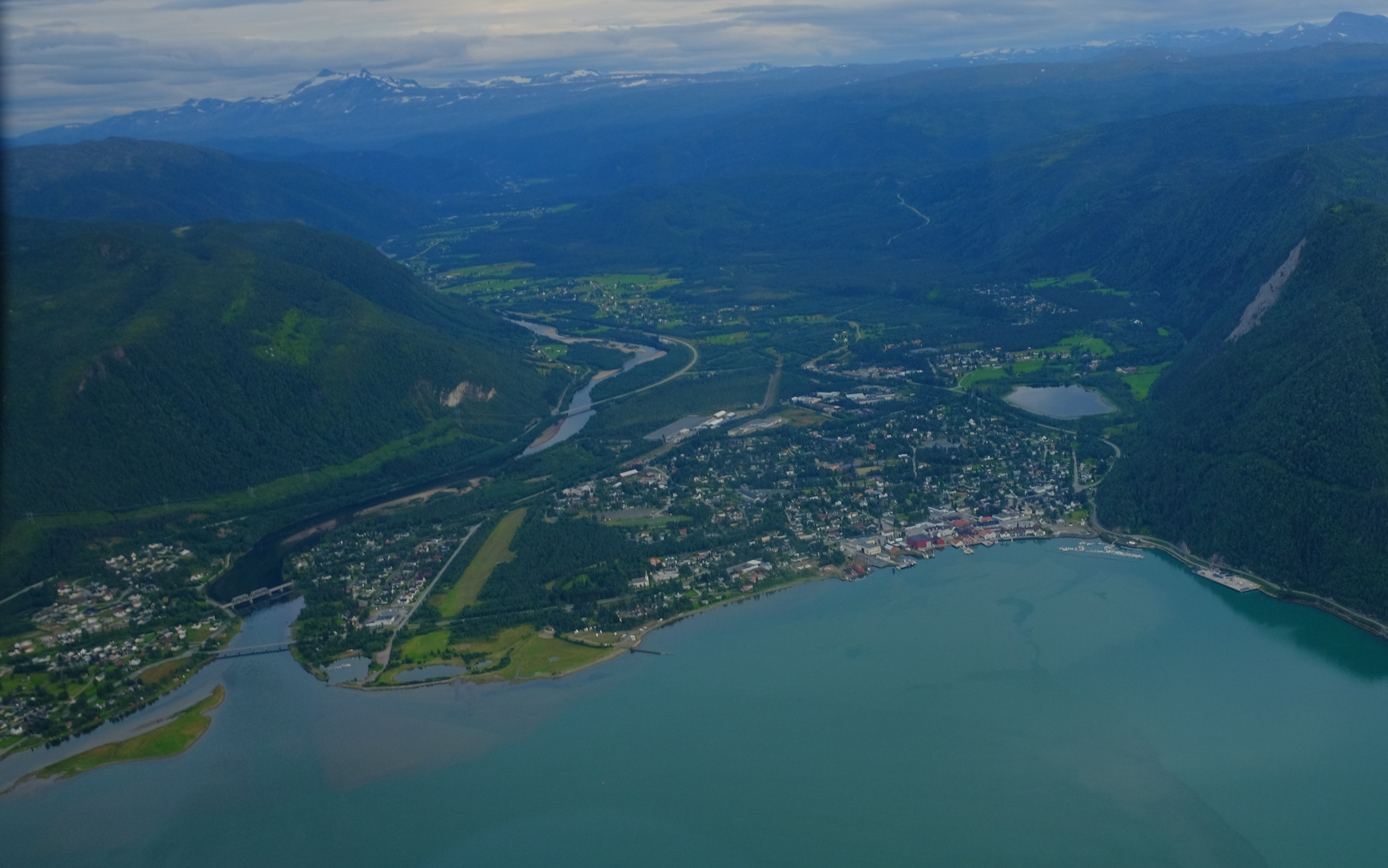
- View of Saltdal where the valley meets the fjord

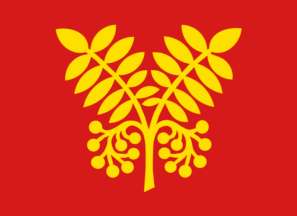
- Flag Coat of arms

- Nordland within Norway

- Saltdal within Nordland
- Coordinates: 66°55′12″N 15°33′36″E
- Country: Norway
- County: Nordland
- District: Salten
- Established: 1 Jan 1838
  - Created as: Formannskapsdistrikt
- Administrative centre: Rognan

Government
  - Mayor (2023): Runar Løvdal Jensen (Ap)

Area
  - Total: 2,216.19 km^{2} (855.68 sq mi)
  - Land: 2,083.96 km^{2} (804.62 sq mi)
  - Water: 132.23 km^{2} (51.05 sq mi) 6%
  - Rank: #26 in Norway
- Highest elevation: 1,755.98 m (5,761.1 ft)

Population (2024)
  - Total: 4,880
  - Rank: #186 in Norway
  - Density: 2.2/km^{2} (5.7/sq mi)
  - Change (10 years): ▲ +4.1%
- Demonym: Saltdaling

Official language
  - Norwegian form: Bokmål
- Time zone: UTC+01:00 (CET)
  - Summer (DST): UTC+02:00 (CEST)
- ISO 3166 code: NO-1840
- Website: Official website

Saltdal (Northern Sami: Sálát) is a municipality in Nordland county, Norway. It is part of the traditional district of Salten. The administrative centre of the municipality is the village of Rognan. Other villages in Saltdal include Røkland, Lønsdal, Langset, and Saksenvika.

The 2,216-square-kilometre (856 sq mi) municipality is the 26th largest by area out of the 357 municipalities in Norway. Saltdal Municipality is the 186th most populous municipality in Norway with a population of 4,880. The municipality's population density is 2.2 inhabitants per square kilometre (5.7/sq mi) and its population has increased by 4.1% over the previous 10-year period.

== General information ==
The municipality of Saltdal was established on 1 January 1838 (see formannskapsdistrikt law). In 1949, a small area of Skjerstad Municipality (population: 10) was transferred to Saltdal Municipality. Other than that one change, the borders have never changed.

=== Name ===
The municipality (originally the parish) is named after the Saltdalen valley (Old Norse: Salptardalr). The river Saltdalselva runs through the Saltdalen valley. The first element of the name is the old name of the river, Salpti. The river name is salpt which means "strong stream". The last element is dalr which means "valley" or "dale". Historically, the name of the municipality was spelled Saltdalen. On 3 November 1917, a royal resolution changed the spelling of the name of the municipality to Saltdal, removing the definite form ending -en.

=== Coat of arms ===
The coat of arms was granted on 28 October 1988. The official blazon is "Gules, a rowan twig Or" (Norwegian: I rødt en gull rognekvist). This means the arms have a red field (background) and the charge is two rowan twigs. The rowan twig has a tincture of Or which means it is commonly colored yellow, but if it is made out of metal, then gold is used. This design was chosen to represent nature and the prevalence of rowan forests in the municipality. They are also canting arms because the Norwegian word for rowan is rogn and the municipal centre is the village of Rognan. The arms were designed by Arvid Sveen.

=== Churches ===
The Church of Norway has two parishes (sokn) within Saltdal Municipality. It is part of the Salten prosti (deanery) in the Diocese of Sør-Hålogaland.

Churches in Saltdal Municipality
Parish (sokn)	Church name	Location of the church	Year built
Saltdal	Saltdal Church	Rognan	1862
Øvre Saltdal	Øvre Saltdal Church	Røkland	1938

== History ==
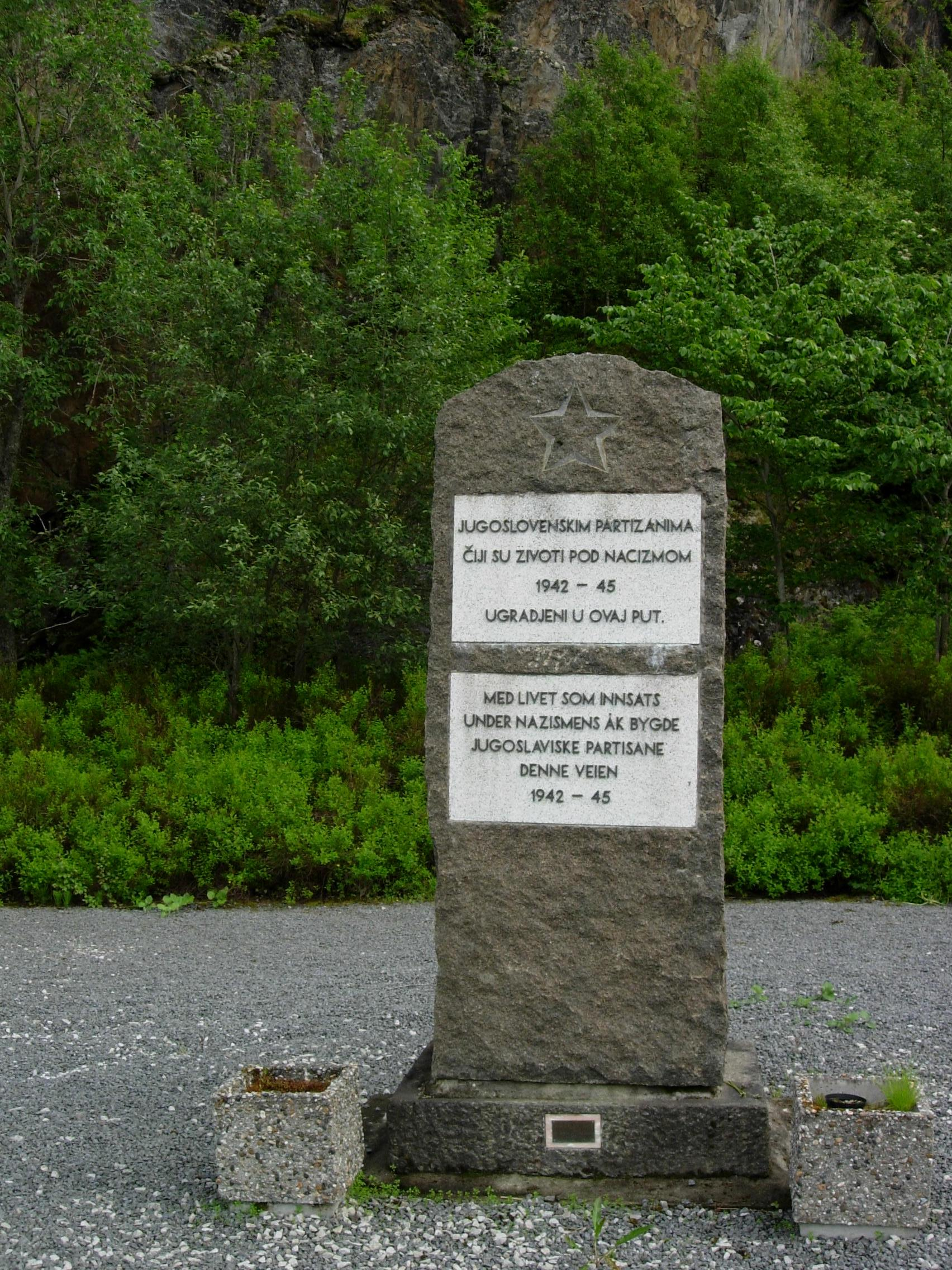
Memorial for the Blood Road

During World War II, the Germans decided to lengthen the Nordland Line from Lønsdal in Saltfjellet going northwards. Over a period of three years, the original plan was to first have both the road and the railroad all the way to Narvik and then on to Kirkenes, but they only managed to build the railroad to Bodø.

The Germans continued to lengthen the road to Kirkenes, and it came to be known as Blodvegen ("the Blood Road") by locals. This project involved prisoners of war, mainly from Yugoslavia and the Soviet Union, in building this road under harsh conditions. The food supplied to the workers at the prison camp where they stayed was not sufficient for the work they were doing, resulting in multiple deaths. In 1943, worker Miloš Banjac was shot and killed during an escape attempt. His brother, Marjan Banjac painted a cross on the mountainside using the blood of his brother. Locals repaint this cross in red paint in remembrance. The road is still walkable, and stretches from Saltnes to Soksenvika. Saltnes has a museum dedicated to this road, called The Blood Road Museum.

Saltdal was known for having some of the most horrifying prisoner-of-war camps in Norway during World War II. A grand total of 15-18 camps with 9,500 Russian, Polish, and Yugoslavian prisoners were located in the valley.

== Government ==
Saltdal Municipality is responsible for primary education (through 10th grade), outpatient health services, senior citizen services, welfare and other social services, zoning, economic development, and municipal roads and utilities. The municipality is governed by a municipal council of directly elected representatives. The mayor is indirectly elected by a vote of the municipal council. The municipality is under the jurisdiction of the Salten og Lofoten District Court and the Hålogaland Court of Appeal.

=== Municipal council ===
The municipal council (Kommunestyre) of Saltdal Municipality is made up of 21 representatives that are elected to four-year terms. The tables below show the current and historical composition of the council by political party.

Saltdal kommunestyre 2023–2027
Party name (in Norwegian)	Number of representatives
Labour Party (Arbeiderpartiet)	4
Progress Party (Fremskrittspartiet)	5
Conservative Party (Høyre)	2
Christian Democratic Party (Kristelig Folkeparti)	1
Red Party (Rødt)	1
Centre Party (Senterpartiet)	3
Socialist Left Party (Sosialistisk Venstreparti)	3
Saltdal List (Saltdalslista)	2
Total number of members:	21

Saltdal kommunestyre 2019–2023
Party name (in Norwegian)	Number of representatives
Labour Party (Arbeiderpartiet)	4
Progress Party (Fremskrittspartiet)	4
Conservative Party (Høyre)	2
Red Party (Rødt)	2
Centre Party (Senterpartiet)	7
Saltdal List (Saltdalslista)	2
Total number of members:	21

Saltdal kommunestyre 2015–2019
Party name (in Norwegian)	Number of representatives
Labour Party (Arbeiderpartiet)	5
Progress Party (Fremskrittspartiet)	4
Conservative Party (Høyre)	4
Christian Democratic Party (Kristelig Folkeparti)	1
Centre Party (Senterpartiet)	3
Saltdal List (Saltdalslista)	4
Total number of members:	21

Saltdal kommunestyre 2011–2015
Party name (in Norwegian)	Number of representatives
Labour Party (Arbeiderpartiet)	10
Progress Party (Fremskrittspartiet)	3
Conservative Party (Høyre)	9
Christian Democratic Party (Kristelig Folkeparti)	1
Centre Party (Senterpartiet)	2
Socialist Left Party (Sosialistisk Venstreparti)	2
Total number of members:	27

Saltdal kommunestyre 2007–2011
Party name (in Norwegian)	Number of representatives
Labour Party (Arbeiderpartiet)	11
Progress Party (Fremskrittspartiet)	7
Conservative Party (Høyre)	2
Christian Democratic Party (Kristelig Folkeparti)	1
Centre Party (Senterpartiet)	2
Socialist Left Party (Sosialistisk Venstreparti)	3
Liberal Party (Venstre)	1
Total number of members:	27

Saltdal kommunestyre 2003–2007
Party name (in Norwegian)	Number of representatives
Labour Party (Arbeiderpartiet)	9
Progress Party (Fremskrittspartiet)	6
Conservative Party (Høyre)	2
Christian Democratic Party (Kristelig Folkeparti)	1
Centre Party (Senterpartiet)	3
Socialist Left Party (Sosialistisk Venstreparti)	4
Liberal Party (Venstre)	1
Saltdal local politics list (Saltdal Lokalpolitiske Liste)	1
Total number of members:	27

Saltdal kommunestyre 1999–2003
Party name (in Norwegian)	Number of representatives
Labour Party (Arbeiderpartiet)	10
Progress Party (Fremskrittspartiet)	3
Conservative Party (Høyre)	2
Christian Democratic Party (Kristelig Folkeparti)	1
Red Electoral Alliance (Rød Valgallianse)	1
Centre Party (Senterpartiet)	6
Socialist Left Party (Sosialistisk Venstreparti)	2
Liberal Party (Venstre)	1
Saltdal local politics list (Saltdal lokalpolitiske liste)	1
Total number of members:	27

Saltdal kommunestyre 1995–1999
Party name (in Norwegian)	Number of representatives
Labour Party (Arbeiderpartiet)	9
Progress Party (Fremskrittspartiet)	2
Conservative Party (Høyre)	3
Christian Democratic Party (Kristelig Folkeparti)	1
Red Electoral Alliance (Rød Valgallianse)	1
Centre Party (Senterpartiet)	5
Socialist Left Party (Sosialistisk Venstreparti)	2
Liberal Party (Venstre)	1
Saltdal local politics list (Saltdal lokalpolitiske liste)	3
Total number of members:	27

Saltdal kommunestyre 1991–1995
Party name (in Norwegian)	Number of representatives
Labour Party (Arbeiderpartiet)	12
Progress Party (Fremskrittspartiet)	1
Conservative Party (Høyre)	3
Christian Democratic Party (Kristelig Folkeparti)	1
Red Electoral Alliance (Rød Valgallianse)	1
Centre Party (Senterpartiet)	2
Socialist Left Party (Sosialistisk Venstreparti)	3
Saltdal local politics list (Saltdal lokalpolitiske liste)	2
Saltdal cross-party list (Saltdal tverrpolitiske liste)	2
Total number of members:	27

Saltdal kommunestyre 1987–1991
Party name (in Norwegian)	Number of representatives
Labour Party (Arbeiderpartiet)	12
Conservative Party (Høyre)	4
Christian Democratic Party (Kristelig Folkeparti)	1
Red Electoral Alliance (Rød Valgallianse)	2
Centre Party (Senterpartiet)	2
Socialist Left Party (Sosialistisk Venstreparti)	2
Liberal Party (Venstre)	1
Cross-party list (Tverrpolitisk liste)	3
Total number of members:	27

Saltdal kommunestyre 1983–1987
Party name (in Norwegian)	Number of representatives
Labour Party (Arbeiderpartiet)	14
Conservative Party (Høyre)	5
Christian Democratic Party (Kristelig Folkeparti)	1
Red Electoral Alliance (Rød Valgallianse)	1
Centre Party (Senterpartiet)	2
Socialist Left Party (Sosialistisk Venstreparti)	3
Liberal Party (Venstre)	1
Total number of members:	27

Saltdal kommunestyre 1979–1983
Party name (in Norwegian)	Number of representatives
Labour Party (Arbeiderpartiet)	12
Conservative Party (Høyre)	7
Christian Democratic Party (Kristelig Folkeparti)	2
Centre Party (Senterpartiet)	3
Socialist Left Party (Sosialistisk Venstreparti)	2
Liberal Party (Venstre)	1
Total number of members:	27

Saltdal kommunestyre 1975–1979
Party name (in Norwegian)	Number of representatives
Labour Party (Arbeiderpartiet)	10
Conservative Party (Høyre)	2
Christian Democratic Party (Kristelig Folkeparti)	1
Centre Party (Senterpartiet)	5
Socialist Left Party (Sosialistisk Venstreparti)	2
Liberal Party (Venstre)	1
Total number of members:	21

Saltdal kommunestyre 1971–1975
Party name (in Norwegian)	Number of representatives
Labour Party (Arbeiderpartiet)	11
Conservative Party (Høyre)	2
Christian Democratic Party (Kristelig Folkeparti)	1
Centre Party (Senterpartiet)	4
Liberal Party (Venstre)	1
Socialist common list (Venstresosialistiske felleslister)	2
Total number of members:	21

Saltdal kommunestyre 1967–1971
Party name (in Norwegian)	Number of representatives
Labour Party (Arbeiderpartiet)	12
Conservative Party (Høyre)	3
Communist Party (Kommunistiske Parti)	1
Centre Party (Senterpartiet)	3
Socialist People's Party (Sosialistisk Folkeparti)	1
Liberal Party (Venstre)	1
Total number of members:	21

Saltdal kommunestyre 1963–1967
Party name (in Norwegian)	Number of representatives
Labour Party (Arbeiderpartiet)	13
Conservative Party (Høyre)	2
Communist Party (Kommunistiske Parti)	1
Centre Party (Senterpartiet)	4
Liberal Party (Venstre)	1
Total number of members:	21

Saltdal herredsstyre 1959–1963
Party name (in Norwegian)	Number of representatives
Labour Party (Arbeiderpartiet)	11
Conservative Party (Høyre)	2
Communist Party (Kommunistiske Parti)	2
Centre Party (Senterpartiet)	4
Liberal Party (Venstre)	2
Total number of members:	21

Saltdal herredsstyre 1955–1959
Party name (in Norwegian)	Number of representatives
Labour Party (Arbeiderpartiet)	13
Conservative Party (Høyre)	2
Communist Party (Kommunistiske Parti)	2
Farmers' Party (Bondepartiet)	2
Liberal Party (Venstre)	2
Total number of members:	21

Saltdal herredsstyre 1951–1955
Party name (in Norwegian)	Number of representatives
Labour Party (Arbeiderpartiet)	11
Communist Party (Kommunistiske Parti)	3
Liberal Party (Venstre)	3
Joint List(s) of Non-Socialist Parties (Borgerlige Felleslister)	4
Total number of members:	21

Saltdal herredsstyre 1947–1951
Party name (in Norwegian)	Number of representatives
Labour Party (Arbeiderpartiet)	10
Communist Party (Kommunistiske Parti)	2
Liberal Party (Venstre)	2
Joint List(s) of Non-Socialist Parties (Borgerlige Felleslister)	2
Total number of members:	16

Saltdal herredsstyre 1945–1947
Party name (in Norwegian)	Number of representatives
Labour Party (Arbeiderpartiet)	9
Communist Party (Kommunistiske Parti)	3
Liberal Party (Venstre)	3
Joint List(s) of Non-Socialist Parties (Borgerlige Felleslister)	1
Total number of members:	16

Saltdal herredsstyre 1937–1941*
Party name (in Norwegian)	Number of representatives
Labour Party (Arbeiderpartiet)	9
Liberal Party (Venstre)	3
Joint List(s) of Non-Socialist Parties (Borgerlige Felleslister)	4
Total number of members:	16
Note: Due to the German occupation of Norway during World War II, no elections were held for new municipal councils until after the war ended in 1945.

=== Mayors ===
The mayor (Norwegian: ordfører) of Saltdal Municipality is the political leader of the municipality and the chairperson of the municipal council. Here is a list of people who have held this position:

- 1838–1840: Petter Ellingsen Saltnæs, Sr.
- 1840–1842: Rev. Jacob Preus Breder
- 1842–1844: Petter Ellingsen Saltnæs, Sr.
- 1844–1848: Rev. Anders Otterbech
- 1848–1850: Jens Erik Angell Schjelderup
- 1850–1856: Rev. Christian Wilhelm Koren
- 1857–1859: Georg Wasmuth Sejersted
- 1859–1861: Carl Olsen
- 1861–1863: Rev. Ole Christian Gjersing
- 1863–1864: Simon Kildal Nilsen
- 1864–1870: Rev. Wollert Dankertsen Meyer
- 1871–1873: Carl Olsen
- 1873–1875: Petter Ellingsen Saltnæs, Jr. (H)
- 1875–1885: Iver Michael Bentsen
- 1886–1892: Ole Johannes Andreas Monsen (V)
- 1893–1895: Kristen Olsen Langset (V)
- 1895–1897: Ole Martinus Benjaminsen (H)
- 1897–1910: Peder Carl Olsen Vik (H)
- 1911–1913: Ole Kristensen Langset
- 1914–1916: Andor Hasselberg Hansen (V)
- 1917–1919: Mons Høihilder (ArbDem)
- 1919–1922: Andor Hasselberg Hansen (V)
- 1923–1934: Arnt Ove Krane (H)
- 1935–1938: Oskar Theodor Støre (V)
- 1938–1941: Kristen J. Næstby (Ap)
- 1941–1942: Johan Kristoffersen (NS)
- 1942–1943: Samuel Giæver (NS)
- 1943–1945: Julius B. Wilson (NS)
- 1945–1946: Kristen J. Næstby (Ap)
- 1946–1975: Hilmar Konrad Hansen (Ap)
- 1975–1979: Johan Solberg (Ap)
- 1979–1983: Odd Storteig (H)
- 1983–1987: Terje Torkildsen (Ap)
- 1987–1991: Odd Storteig (H)
- 1991–1995: Terje Torkildsen (Ap)
- 1995–1999: Tove Engan (Sp)
- 1999–2011: Kjell Magne Johansen (Ap)
- 2011–2015: Finn-Obert Bentsen (Ap)
- 2015–2023: Rune Berg (Sp)
- 2023–present: Runar Løvdal Jensen (Ap)

== Geography ==
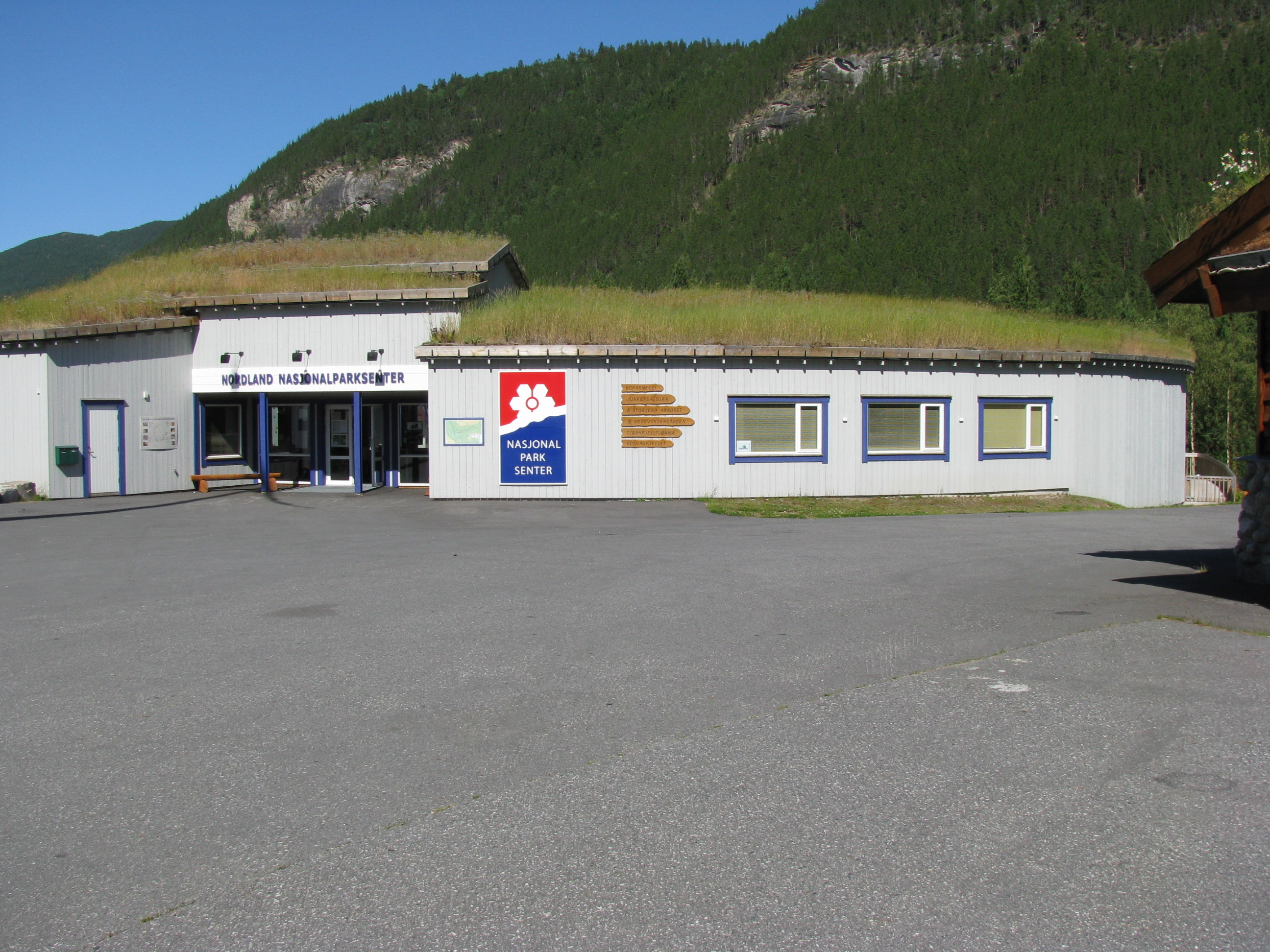
Nordland National Park Centre is situated at Storjord, Saltdal

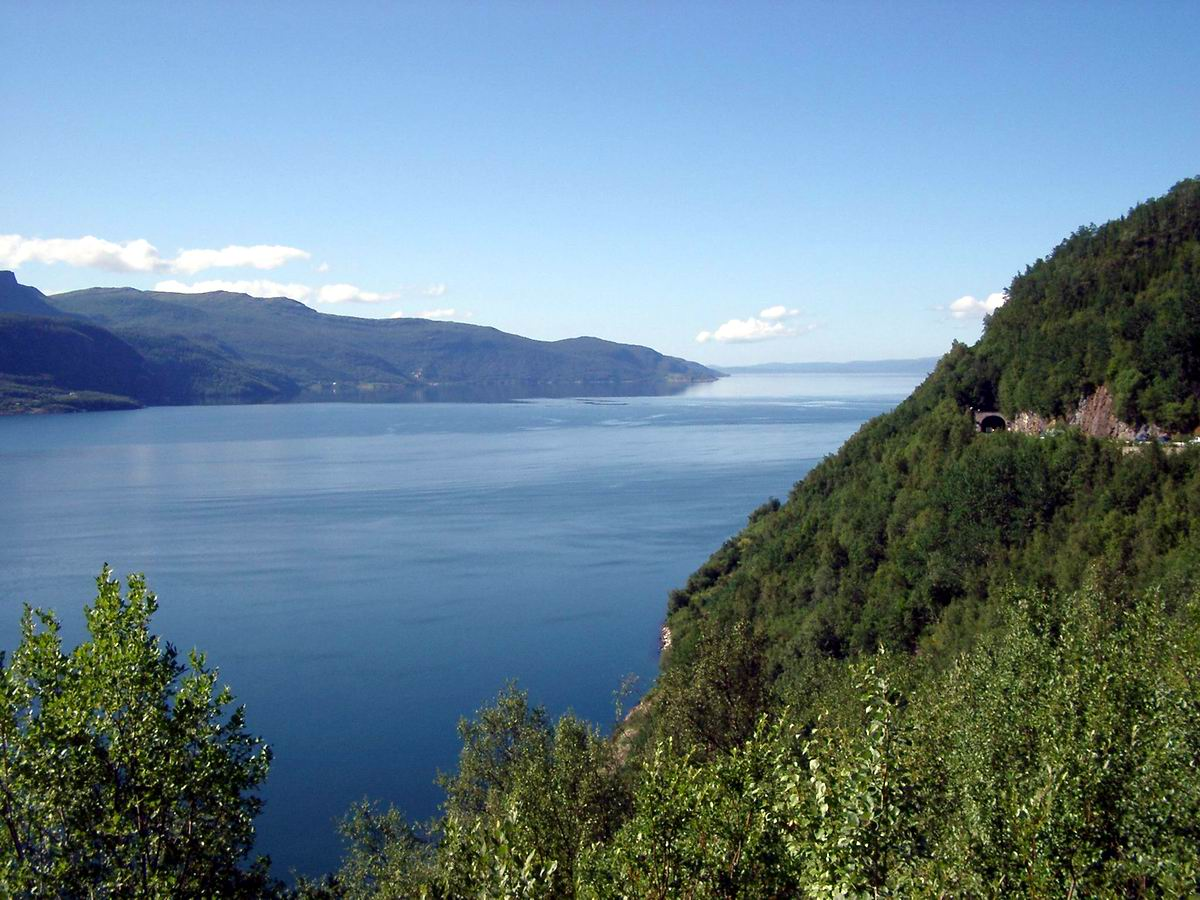
To the north, Saltdal borders Saltdal Fjord, innermost part of Skjerstadfjord, with road and railway to Fauske on the eastern slope of the fjord.

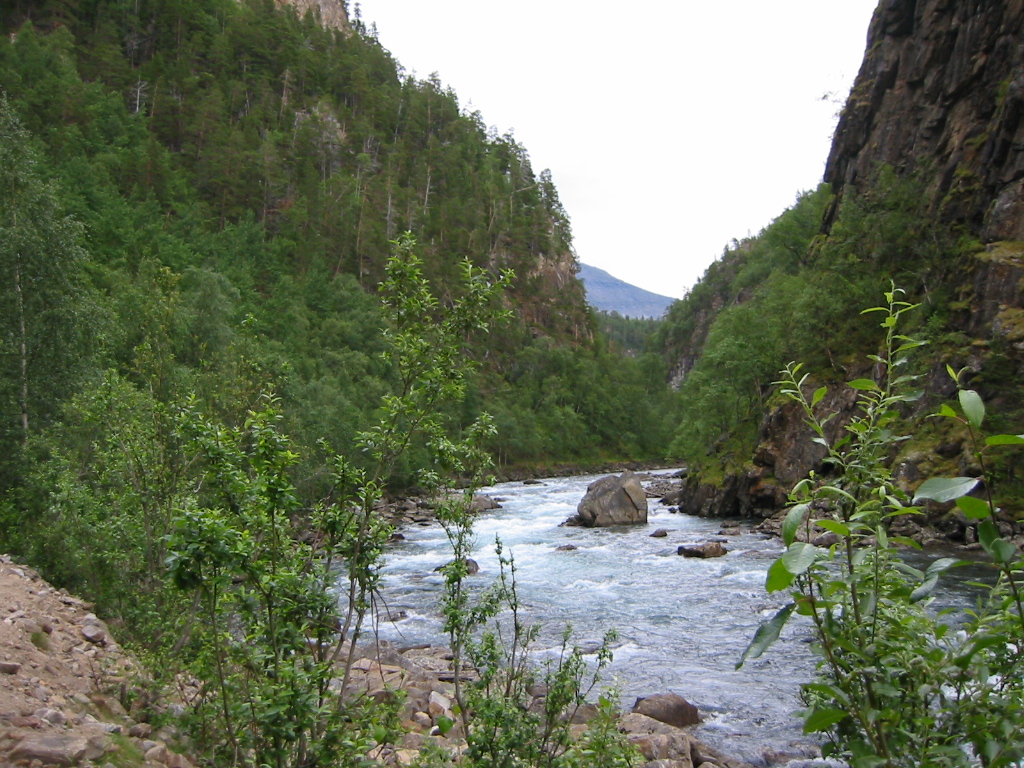
Part of Junkerdal Nature Reserve

The main population centre in the municipality is Rognan, on the southern shore of the Saltdal Fjord, where the valley floor meets the fjord. When the Ice age ended and the ice had melted 9,000 years ago, the valley was a fjord as the sea reached what is today an elevation of 120 metres (390 ft) due to isostatic depression. The valley is situated north of the Arctic Circle. The highest point in the municipality is the 1,755.98-metre (5,761.1 ft) tall mountain Nordre Saulo, located within Junkerdal National Park.

Two national parks are partially in the municipality: Saltfjellet–Svartisen National Park in the southwest, and Junkerdal National Park in the eastern part. This makes Saltdal one of the municipalities in Norway with the largest percentage of protected areas within its borders. The river Saltdalselva runs through the valley. The riverbed appears very bright in some places due to the minerals in the sand. The valley is covered with pine forest and birch and other trees are common as well. Lakes in the region include Balvatnet, Fiskeløysvatnet, Kjemåvatnet, and Nordre Bjøllåvatnet. The mountain Ørfjellet is also located in the municipality.

=== Climate ===
Certain areas are particularly arid, with the southern part of the Saltdalen valley being the driest area in Northern Europe except Svalbard. Here, the Saltfjellet mountains blocks precipitation from the west and south, while several other mountain ranges blocks precipitation from the east. Between 2001 and 2005, and again in 2007 and 2008, the weather station at Borkamo (81 m) in the southern part of the valley recorded the least precipitation in mainland Norway. Only 74 millimetres (2.9 in) fell in 2005, setting a new national record. Located on a farm from 1982 to 2012, data reveal it to be driest location on the Norwegian mainland, with only 211 millimetres (8.3 in) precipitation annually.

From 2013 onwards, the weather station at Nordnes (39 m) seized the operations of the old station at Borkamo. This station is located about 10 kilometres (6.2 mi) northwards at a camping site, but still in the upper part of the valley (Øvre Saltdal). This station receives considerably more precipitation, with 661 millimetres (26.0 in) annually, highlighting the significant microclimatic variations in the area.

Despite the generally low precipitation, there is lush vegetation with meadows and forests on the side of the mountains due to the low temperatures reducing evapotranspiration. Due to the rarity of extreme cold snaps, the environment and plant hardiness resemble latitudes further south in the Nordic interior.

Saltdalen is often one of Norway's warmest areas when the right weather situation occurs (wind from the south/southeast). It is not uncommon with daytime temperatures approaching and sometimes exceeding 30 °C (86 °F) in the summer months. During a heatwave in June 2011, Borkamo recorded four days in a row with daytime temperatures exceeding 30 °C (86 °F). On 11 June 2011, Borkamo recorded a daytime high of 33.8 °C (92.8 °F), which was a new heat record for Nordland county in the month of June. During the July 2019 European heat wave the temperature reached 34.6 °C (94.3 °F) at Nordnes, the highest temperature ever measured north of the Arctic Circle in Norway. Similarly, winter temperatures can be quite cold, often dropping below −20 °C (−4 °F) on a clear day. The all-time low −32.2 °C (−26.0 °F) was recorded January 2010 at Borkamo.

Climate data for Saltdal - Borkamo 1991-2020 (81 m, avg high/low 1991-2012, extremes 1982-2020 also including Nordnes)
Month	Jan	Feb	Mar	Apr	May	Jun	Jul	Aug	Sep	Oct	Nov	Dec	Year
Record high °C (°F)	12.9 (55.2)	11.8 (53.2)	14.8 (58.6)	19.5 (67.1)	29.7 (85.5)	33.8 (92.8)	34.6 (94.3)	32.6 (90.7)	25.9 (78.6)	20.3 (68.5)	15.3 (59.5)	13.3 (55.9)	34.6 (94.3)
Mean daily maximum °C (°F)	−1.1 (30.0)	−1.5 (29.3)	2.3 (36.1)	6.9 (44.4)	12.0 (53.6)	16.9 (62.4)	20.4 (68.7)	17.3 (63.1)	13.2 (55.8)	6.5 (43.7)	1.7 (35.1)	−0.6 (30.9)	7.8 (46.1)
Daily mean °C (°F)	−4.3 (24.3)	−4.7 (23.5)	−2.7 (27.1)	1.9 (35.4)	7.0 (44.6)	11.4 (52.5)	14.3 (57.7)	12.8 (55.0)	8.1 (46.6)	3.2 (37.8)	−1.0 (30.2)	−2.9 (26.8)	3.6 (38.5)
Mean daily minimum °C (°F)	−6.1 (21.0)	−7.5 (18.5)	−5.3 (22.5)	−0.9 (30.4)	2.8 (37.0)	6.1 (43.0)	9.7 (49.5)	8.7 (47.7)	5.3 (41.5)	0.7 (33.3)	−3.2 (26.2)	−5.2 (22.6)	0.4 (32.8)
Record low °C (°F)	−32.5 (−26.5)	−31.6 (−24.9)	−26.5 (−15.7)	−20.3 (−4.5)	−7.0 (19.4)	−3.0 (26.6)	−1.0 (30.2)	−2.4 (27.7)	−8.2 (17.2)	−18.0 (−0.4)	−26.6 (−15.9)	−28.0 (−18.4)	−32.5 (−26.5)
Average precipitation mm (inches)	27.6 (1.09)	16 (0.6)	15.8 (0.62)	6.7 (0.26)	10.2 (0.40)	14 (0.6)	21.6 (0.85)	22.4 (0.88)	24.5 (0.96)	20.1 (0.79)	14.9 (0.59)	17.4 (0.69)	211.2 (8.33)
Source 1: eklima/Norwegian Meteorological Institute
Source 2: Infoclimat Saltdal 1991-2012

== Transportation ==
The European route E6 highway passes through the entire length of Saltdal, with the Nordland Line running alongside it. A road running east through the Junkerdalen valley (National Road 77) leads to Sweden. The nearest main airport is in Bodø, about 90 minutes from Rognan by road. There is a general aviation airport—Rognan Airport.

== Economy ==
One of the largest employers in Saltdal Municipality is Nexans. The company's Rognan factory specializes in telecommunications, fibre optics and copper cables. There is also some agriculture in Saltdal, and many people work within public services.

In September 2023, a local manufacturer of cabins laid off many workers during a time where demand was slowing.

Saltdal has a history in boat building out of local timber. Especially before World War II, the boatbuilding industry employed a large percentage of Saltdal's population.

== Notable people ==
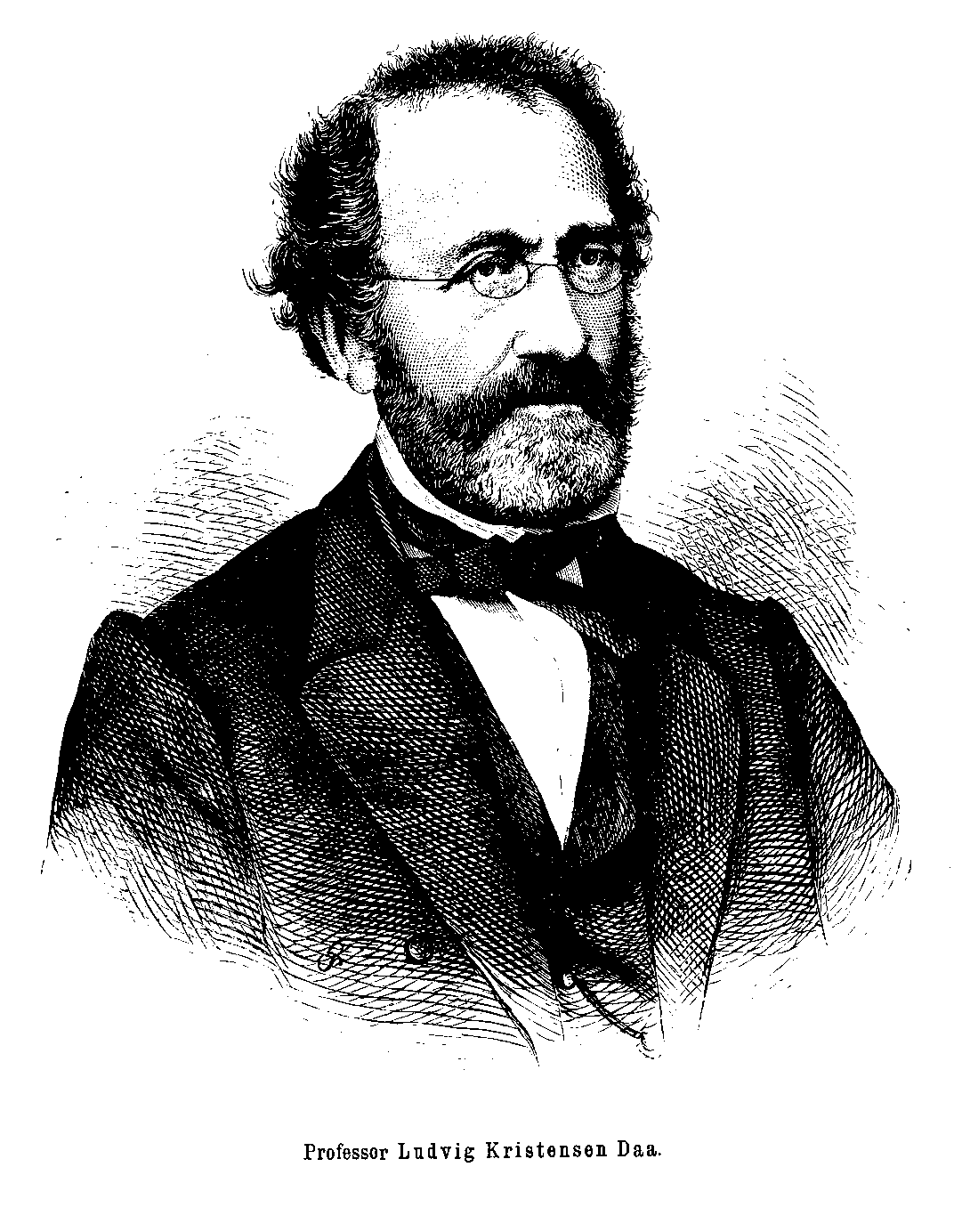
Ludvig Kristensen Daa, 1877

- Ludvig Kristensen Daa (1809 in Saltdal – 1877), a historian, ethnologist, auditor, editor of magazines and newspapers, educator and politician
- Arne Hjersing (1860 in Saltdal – 1926), a painter
- Bernhoff Hansen (1877 in Rognan – 1950), a wrestler, gold medallist in the 1904 Summer Olympics
- Erling Engan (1910 in Saltdal – 1982), a Norwegian politician
- Trygve Henrik Hoff (1938 in Rognan – 1987), a singer, composer, songwriter and writer
- Hans-Erik Husby (1972 – 2021), a rock singer (Turbonegro); lived about five years in Rognan in his childhood and early teens
- Ragnhild Furebotten (born 1979 in Saltdal), a fiddler, folk musician and composer
- Lena Kristin Ellingsen (born 1980 in Saltdal), an actress

== See also ==
- Blodveien ["The blood road"]
