= Stang =

Stang is a surname. Notable people with the surname include:

- Arnold Stang (1918–2009), American actor
- Axel Heiberg Stang (1904–1974), Norwegian landowner and member of Vidkun Quisling's government
- Christian Schweigaard Stang (1900–1977), Norwegian linguist and professor
- Dorothy Stang (1931–2005), American-born Roman Catholic nun, anti-poverty and environmental activist, and murder victim
- Emil Stang (1834–1912), Norwegian jurist and politician
- Emil Stang (born 1882), Norwegian jurist, politician and Chief Justice of the Supreme Court of Norway
- Fabian Stang (born 1955), mayor of Oslo, Norway
- Frederik Stang (1804–1884), first Prime Minister of Norway
- Fredrik Stang (1867–1941), Minister of Justice and the Police of Norway and law professor
- Georg Stang (1858–1907), Minister of Defence of Norway
- Hans Georg Jacob Stang (prime minister) (1830–1907), Prime Minister of Norway
- Ivan Stang (born 1953), author and publisher of the first screed of the Church of the SubGenius
- Jack Stang (1923–1996), inspiration for writer Mickey Spillane's character Mike Hammer
- Jens Petter Stang (born 1977), Norwegian footballer
- Jørn L. Stang (born 1959), Norwegian politician
- Nicholas Stang, Canadian philosopher
- Olaf Stang (1871–1956), Norwegian engineer
- Ole A. Stang (1872–1955), Norwegian businessperson and landowner
- Ole A. Stang, Jr. (1923–1998), Norwegian businessperson; son of Thomas Stang and grandson of Ole Stang
- Oliver Stang (born 1988), German footballer
- Peter J. Stang (born 1941), American chemist and professor
- Rita Stang (1894–1978), Australian medical practitioner
- Theodor Stang (1836–1919), Norwegian engineer
- Thomas Stang (1897–1982), Norwegian forester and businessman
- William Stang (1854–1907), German-born Roman Catholic bishop

== See also ==
- All Platinum Records – Stang was a subsidiary label
- Ford Mustang, sometimes used as a slang term
- Stang, County Down, a townland in County Down, Northern Ireland
- Stang (witchcraft), a forked staff used as a ritual tool in contemporary witchcraft
