= Ole A. Stang Jr. =

Norwegian businessperson (1923–1998)

Ole Andreas Stang (30 May 1923 – 10 November 1998) was a Norwegian businessperson, who owned and led the company Maarud from 1960 to 1983.

== Personal life ==
He was a son of landowner and industrialist Thomas Stang. He was a paternal grandson of landowner Ole A. Stang and Emma Heiberg, grandnephew of ship-owner Jørgen Breder Stang, great-grandson of landowner Mads Wiel Stang and politician Axel Heiberg and nephew of Axel Heiberg Stang.

His father married actress Wenche Foss in 1953. Stang was thus a half-brother of politician Fabian Stang.

== Career ==
Ole A. Stang took an economist education in the United States. He took over the family property Maarud in Sør-Odal Municipality in 1960, which had been bought by his grandfather in 1911. He has been credited with saving the family business from economic failure, and refined it into the modern snack company Maarud. Production facilities for potato chips and dessert cheese were erected at the family farm. He sold the industrial part of the family business to Freia Marabou in 1983, and passed on the farm itself to his son Thomas Stang in 1985.

He was decorated with the King's Medal of Merit in 1997. He died of cancer in November 1998 and was buried at Ullern in Sør-Odal.
