= Ole A. Stang =

Norwegian businessperson and landowner (1872–1955)

Ole Andreas Stang (24 February 1872 – 14 July 1955) was a Norwegian businessperson and landowner.

== Personal life ==
He was born in Sarpsborg as a son of landowner Mads Wiel Stang (1838–1909) og Anna Cathrine Diderikke Christine Breder (1848–1908). He was a brother of Jørgen Breder Stang, second cousin of Olaf Stang and third cousin of Emil Stang, Jr. and Fredrik Stang.

In 1895 he married Emma Heiberg (1874–1927), who became mistress of the robes in the Norwegian royal court. She was a daughter of consul Axel Heiberg and Ragnhild Meyer. They had the sons Axel Heiberg Stang and Thomas Stang. The latter had the son Ole A. Stang, Jr., and later married Wenche Foss with whom he had the son Fabian Stang.

== Career ==
After finishing his secondary education in 1890, he graduated from the Royal Frederick University with the cand.jur. degree in 1898. After undergoing training in the timber business in Norway and abroad, he became attorney for the company Mads W. Stang in 1898 and partner in 1904. He was the manager of this company for ten years until 1919, when it was liquidated and the assets divided between Stang and two brothers. He took over large forest estates previously owned by the company. He first settled at the property Solbakken at Skøyen, later in rural Rømskog Municipality. He also bought the property Maarud in Sør-Odal Municipality in 1911, which became the basis for his son and grandson's snack company Maarud.

He was a board member of Saugbrugsforeningen from 1908, and chairman from 1925 to 1945. He also chaired Lillestrøm Dampsag og Høvleri from 1919 to 1931, Forsikringsselskapet Norden and the supervisory council of the Norwegian Forestry Society. He was a board member of Ørje Bruk and Cathrineholm Jernverk. During the 1914 Jubilee Exhibition, he chaired the committee on forestry. He died in July 1955.
