= Emma Stang =

Norwegian court official (1874–1927)

Emma Stang (née Heiberg; 2 August 1874 – 21 March 1927) was a Norwegian court official who served as the overhoffmesterinne for Queen Maud of Norway.A daughter of consul Axel Heiberg and Ragnhild Meyer, she married Ole A. Stang in 1895 and had sons Axel Heiberg Stang and Thomas Stang. After his mother's death, Thomas married actress Wenche Foss, with whom he had a son, Fabian Stang, who served as 66th Mayor of Oslo from 2007 to 2015. Another Stang's grandson from Thomas was Ole A. Stang Jr., born in 1923.

Court offices
Preceded by Marie Magdalena Rustad	Overhoffmesterinne to the Queen of Norway; 1925–1927	Succeeded by Borghild Anker
