= Olaf Stang =

Norwegian engineer (1871–1956)

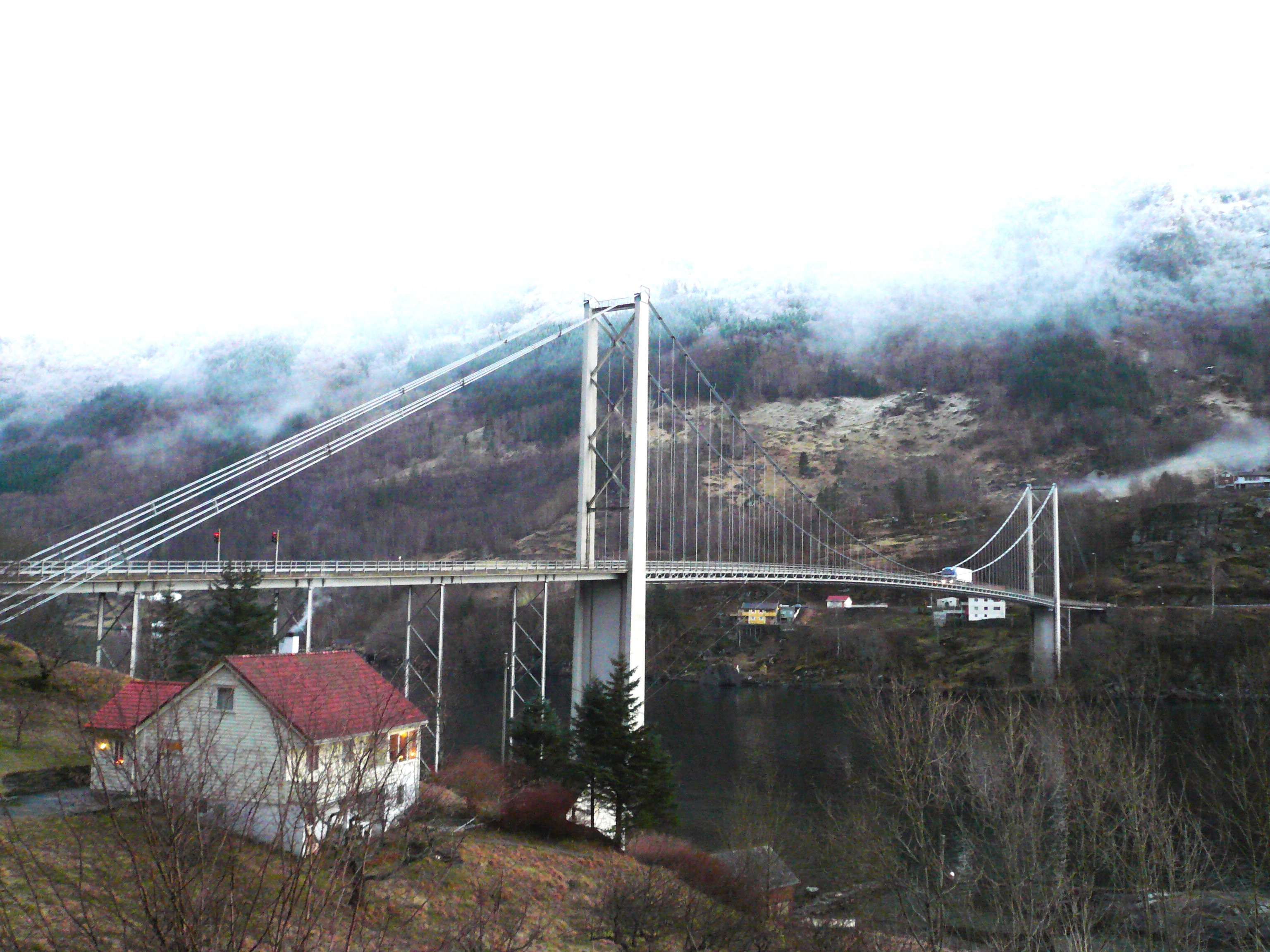
Fyksesund Bridge in Hordaland

Olaf Stang (10 June 1871 – 14 November 1956) was a Norwegian engineer.

He was born in Kristiania (now Oslo), Norway. He was a son of county treasurer Wilhelm Baltazar Stang (1838–1916) and Petra Sørensen. In 1898 he married Olavia Stang from Halden.

He was a second cousin of Jørgen Breder Stang and Ole A. Stang, second cousin once removed of the latter's sons Axel Heiberg Stang and Thomas Stang, third cousin of Emil and Fredrik Stang, and one of his aunts married Johan Peter Weisse.

He finished his secondary education in 1889 and graduated from the Royal School of Drawing in 1894. He was hired in the Norwegian Public Roads Administration in the same year. From 1920 to 1939 he was chief engineer and head of bridge construction. He is best known for his design of suspension bridges including Fyksesund Bridge (Fyksesundbrua) which spans the Fyksesund fjord on the road between the villages of Øystese and Ålvik in the municipality of Kvam in Hordaland, Norway.

He was decorated as a Knight, First Class of the Order of St. Olav in 1939.
