= Theodor Stang =

Norwegian engineer

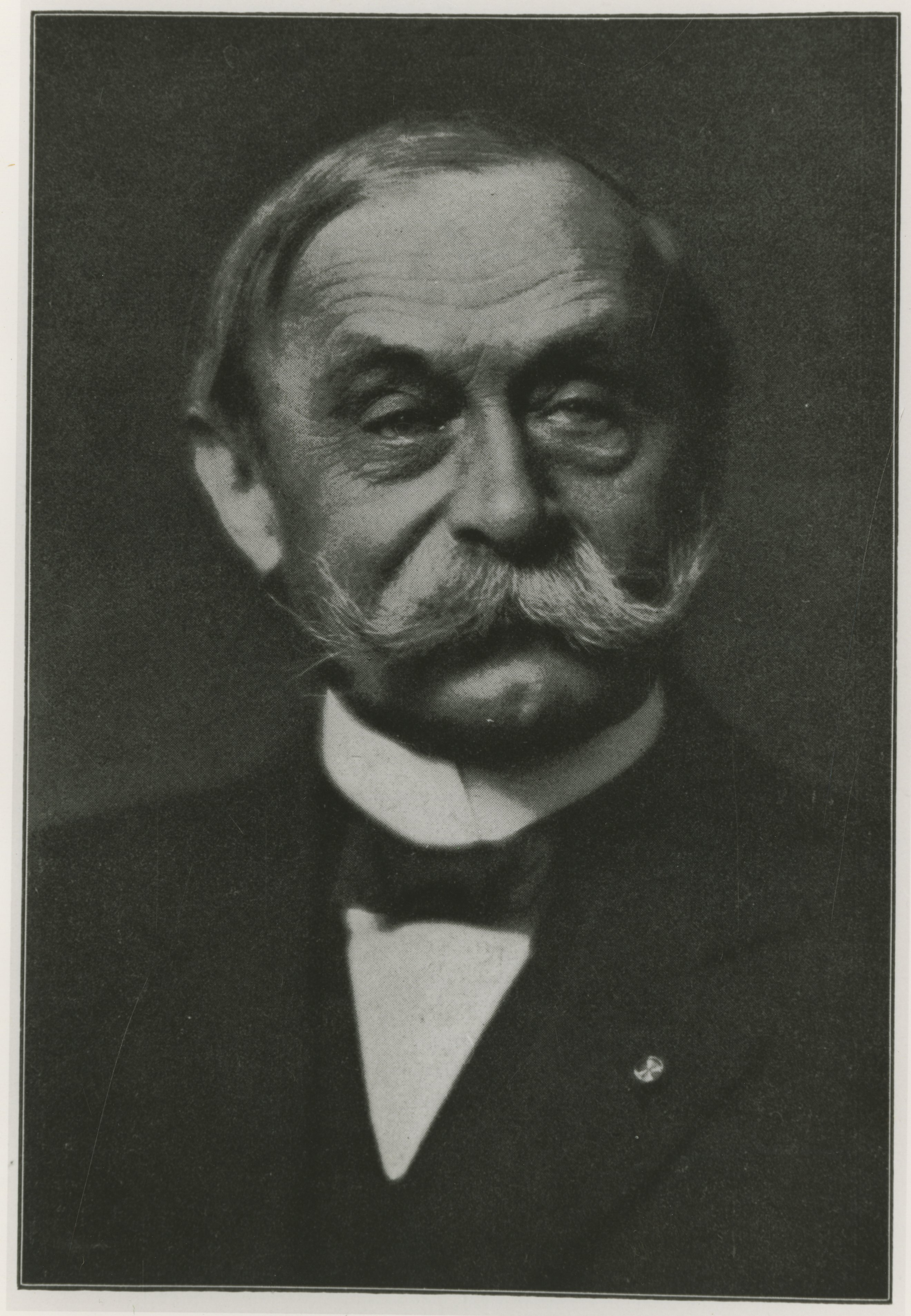
Theodor Stang

Theodor Stang (14 March 1836 – 20 August 1919) was a Norwegian engineer.

Stang was born in Vang i Valdres. He studied in Belgium. From 1862 he worked in the Netherlands. Stang is especially famous for designing the country's longest railway bridge, the Moerdijk Bridge. He later became waterworks director in The Hague for forty years.

== Family ==
Theodor Stang was as a son of vicar Thomas Stang (1804–1874). He was a nephew of Frederik Stang, a first cousin of Emil Stang and a first cousin once removed of Fredrik Stang and Emil Stang, Jr.
