= Sverre Grette =

Norwegian judge

Sverre Grette (31 May 1888 – 25 January 1959) was a Norwegian judge.

He was born in Kristiania. In 1920 he was hired as an assistant secretary (byråsjef) in the Norwegian Ministry of Justice. He became an acting Supreme Court Justice in 1930, and permanent judge in 1936. From 1952 to 1958 he served as its 14th Chief Justice. From 1945 to 1958 he also chaired the Directorate for Enemy Property.

Legal offices
Preceded by Emil Stang	Chief Justice of the Supreme Court of Norway; 1952–1958	Succeeded by Terje Wold
