= Skytta =

- Village
- Location in Akershus
- Coordinates: 60°00′N 10°55′E
- Country: Norway
- Region: Østlandet
- County: Akershus
- Municipality: Nittedal
- Time zone: UTC+01:00 (CET)
  - Summer (DST): UTC+02:00 (CEST)

Skytta is a village in Akershus, Norway. It is located in the south of Nittedal, near Hagan and between Slattum and Gjelleråsen.

Since 1984 the corporation Rosings Industrier has been located here.
