= Nasjonal Samling Ungdomsfylking =

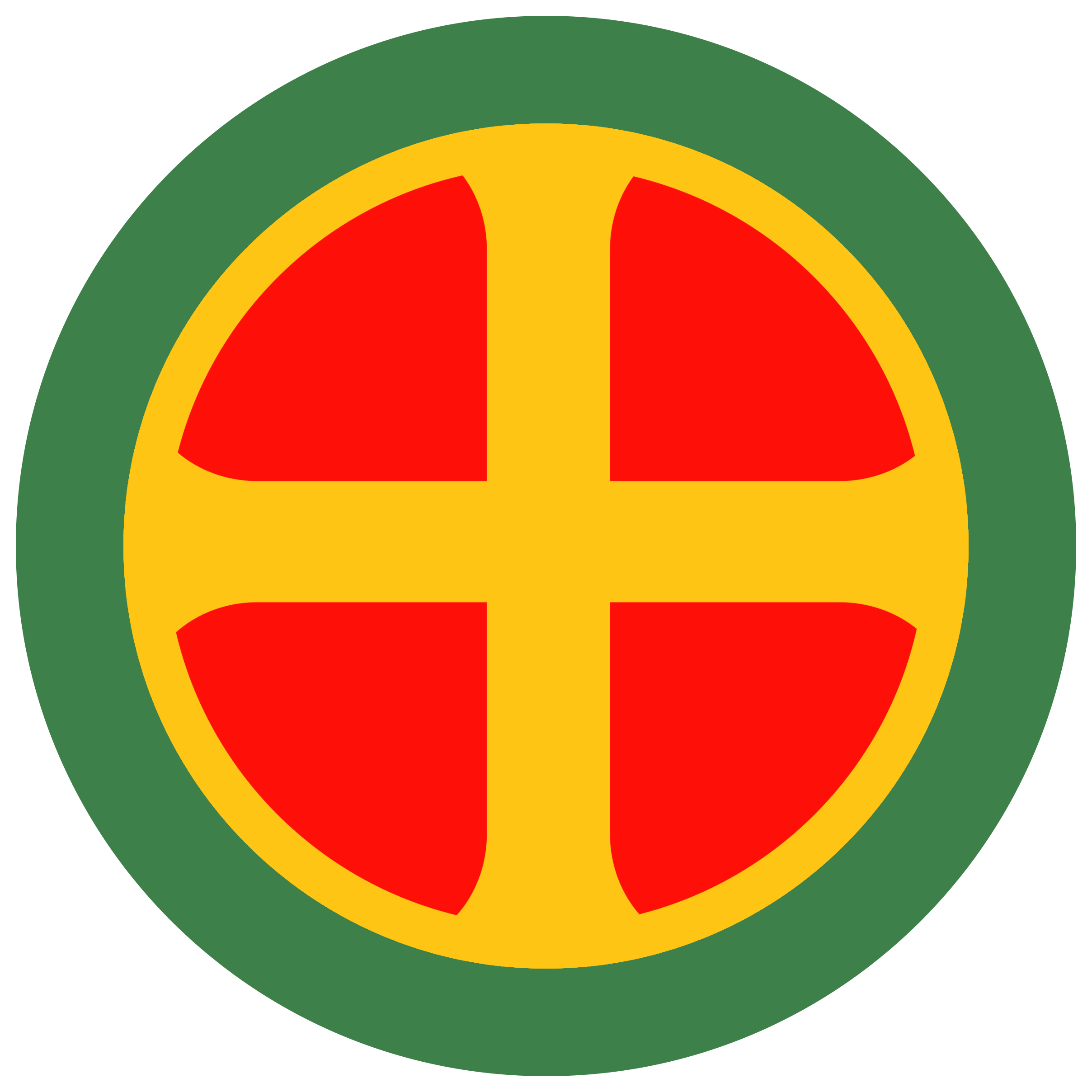
- Chairperson: Axel Heiberg Stang
- Founded: 1933
- Dissolved: May 8th, 1945
- Ideology: Fascism Norwegian nationalism

Party flag

Nasjonal Samlings Ungdomsfylking, abbreviated N.S. Ungdomsfylking and NSUF, was the Norwegian fascist party Nasjonal Samling's organization for children and young people between the ages of 10 and 18 before and during the Second World War from 1933 to liberation in the spring of 1945. NSUF was the Norwegian counterpart to the Hitler Youth, children's and the youth wing of the Nazi Party.

== Origin and development ==
Nasjonal Samling (NS) sprung from Nordisk Folkereisning, a fascist group founded in Oslo in 1931, and was established as a political party through an announcement in Tidens Tegn on 17 May 1933.

The party's youth organization was already established in August of the same year. Then the law student Rolf Jørgen Fuglesang, who later became NS minister during the war, became national leader of the National Youth Movement, an organization that later changed its name to Nasjonal Samling Youth Wing.

== Organization and activities ==
The NSUF was divided into subgroups:

- Småhirden: Jenter 10–14 år
- Guttehirden: Gutter 10–14 år
- Jentehirden: Jenter 14–18 år
- Unghirden: Gutter 14–18 år

The supreme leader of the NSUF was "youth leader" and minister Axel Stang, who was also a minister in Quisling's government. The chiefs of staff for the Unghirden and the Guttehirden represented the organization in the Nasjonal Samling's national leadership. At county level, there was a county youth leader for the boys and a county youth leader for the girls. The organization was built according to roughly the same military pattern as the Hirden, the NS's "elite troops", with a team, troop, platoon, county and regiment.

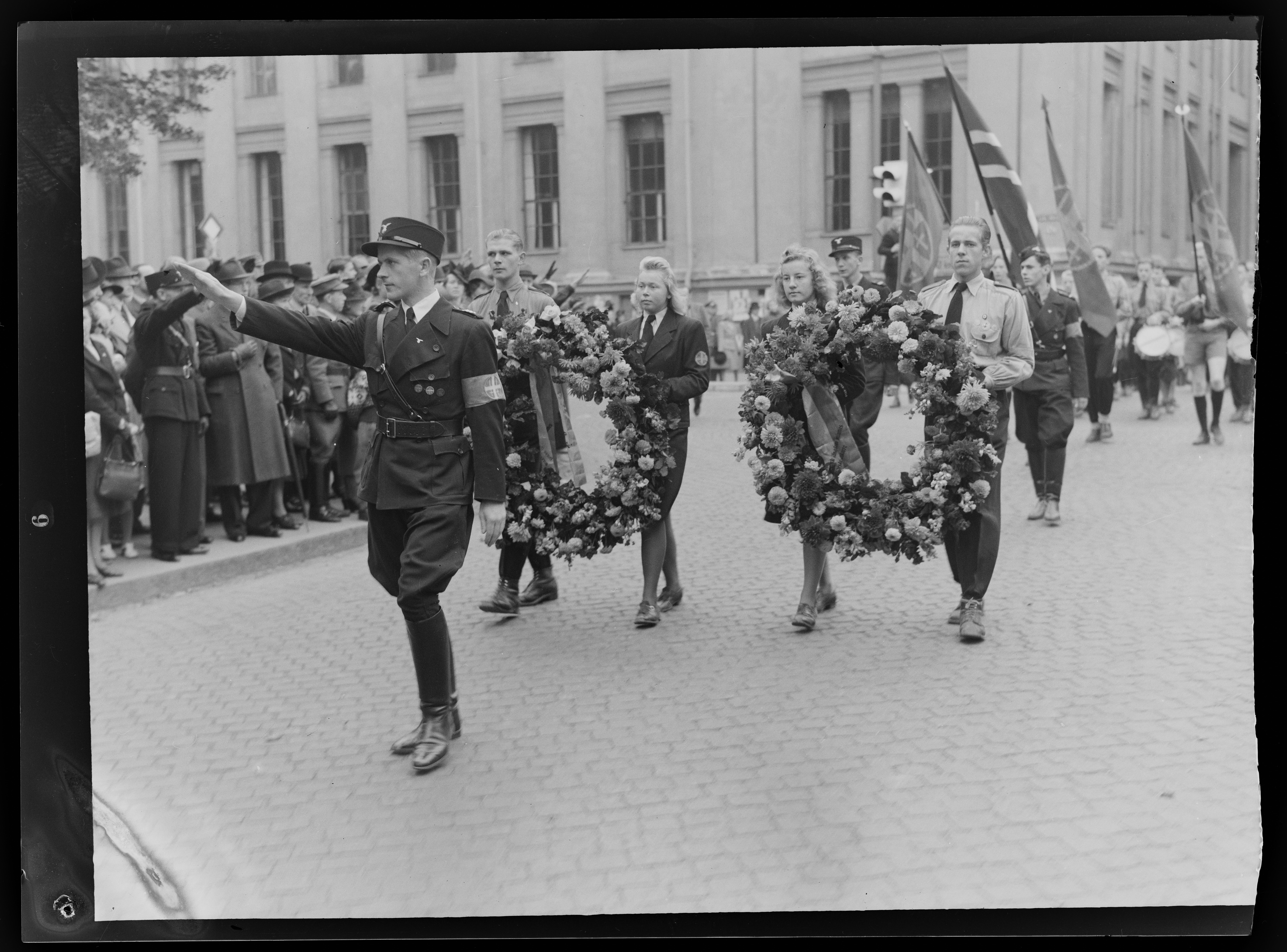
Members of NSUF, Nasjonal Samling's children's and youth organization before and during the war, with uniforms and banners in a period propaganda parade on Karl Johans gate in Oslo during "NSUF's battle day" on 28 September 1941. The wreaths were laid by the statues of Ibsen and Bjørnson outside the National Theater to pay tribute to the great Norwegian authors. Credit: Riksarkivet, NTB's war archive

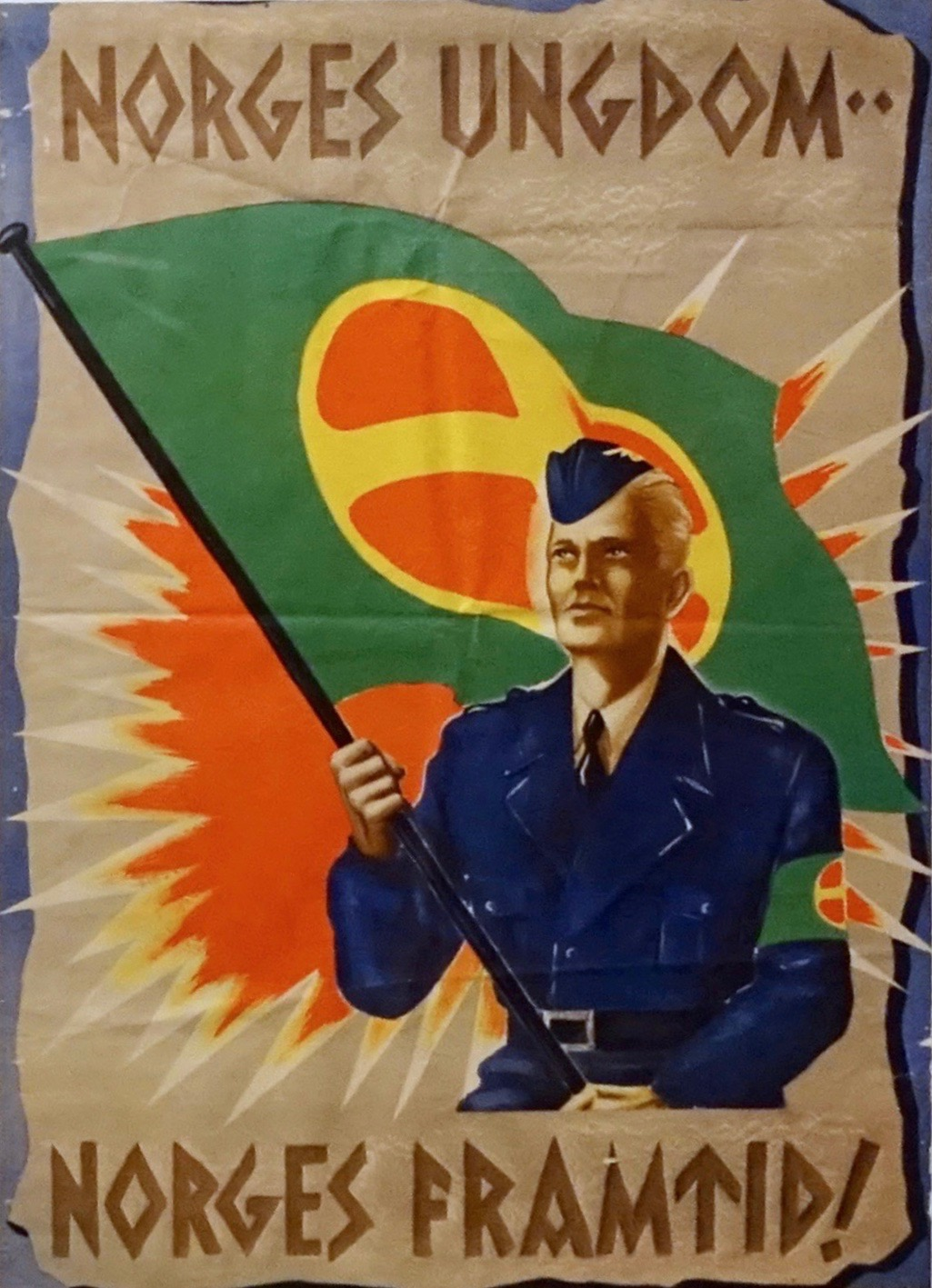
A propaganda poster of the Nasjonal Samling Ungdomsfylking.
