= Rosings Industrier =

Norwegian manufacturing company

Rosings Industrier is a manufacturing company based in Skytta, Nittedal, Norway.

It was founded on 18 November 1895 in Kristiania by Ulrik Fredrik A. Rosing under the name Ulrik Rosing Gjærdeforretning. It produced fences and pedestrian bridges from steel wire; larger bridges constructed by the company include those over Glomma near Borregaard and also at Rånåsfoss. The company name was changed to Rosings Bro- og Gjærdeforretning in 1908, and Rosings Bro- og Gjærdefabrik in 1913. It was owned by Christian D. H. Poppe from 1908, from 1911 jointly with Christian August Steenfeldt-Foss, and from 1913 solely by Steenfeldt-Foss.

The company started manufacturing gates in the 1920s, and expanded with garage gates when automobiles became more usual after the Second World War. After the end of the 1950s it concentrated mainly on fences and related products.

Steenfeldt-Foss died in 1960. The company was bought by Andor Oskarsen in 1972, who changed the name to Rosings Gjerdefabrikk og Mek Verksted. The company expanded with industrial facilities in Nes, Akershus in 1979 and Skytta in 1984, where the entire company was now relocated. In 1987 the production part of the company was renamed Rosings Industrier, while the older company name continued in a demerged branch which dealt with estate management. The actual metal production was demerged in 2004 as Rosmek, as Morten Oskarsen became the main shareholder. Rosings Industrier is now the parent company for Rosings Handel, Rosings Områdesikring and Rosings Portsystemer while Rosmek is independent.
