= Christian August Steenfeldt-Foss =

Norwegian businessperson

Christian August Steenfeldt-Foss (6 June 1878 – 26 November 1960) was a Norwegian businessperson.

He was born in Ski. He learned his trade in the companies B. T. S. for three years Fredrikstad Mekaniske Verksted for two years and J. Samuel White in Cowes for three years. He was then a manager in Brødrene Giebelhausens Trelastbruk in Fredrikstad before becoming a co-owner of Rosings Bro- og Gjærdefabrik in 1911. He later became the sole owner and chief executive officer. Together with Alfhild Røren (1886–1961) he had the daughter Wenche Foss (née Eva Wenche Steenfeldt-Foss), one of Norway's leading actresses from the 1930s to the 2000s. He died in November 1960 and was buried in Ullern. He was a Christian.
