= Terje Wold =

Norwegian politician

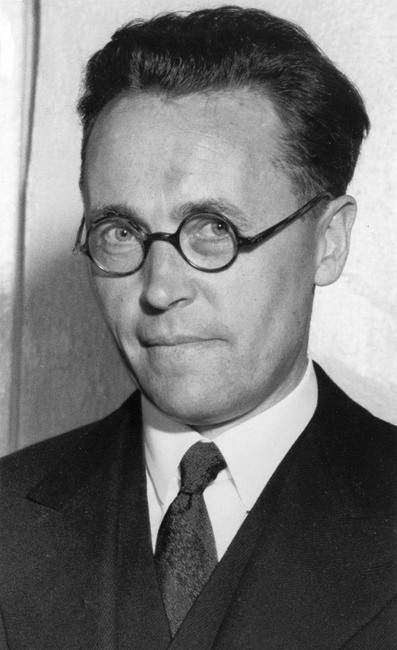

Chief Justice of the Supreme Court of Norway
- In office 1958–1969
- Preceded by: Sverre Grette
- Succeeded by: Rolv Ryssdal

Minister of Justice
- In office 1 July 1939 – 25 June 1945
- Prime Minister: Johan Nygaardsvold
- Preceded by: Trygve Lie
- Succeeded by: Johan Cappelen

Minister of Trade Acting
- In office 7 June 1940 – 15 April 1942
- Prime Minister: Johan Nygaardsvold
- Preceded by: Anders Frihagen
- Succeeded by: Anders Frihagen

Member of the Norwegian Parliament
- In office 4 December 1945 – 31 December 1949
- Constituency: Finnmark

Personal details
- Born: 23 August 1899 Evenes, Nordland, United Kingdoms of Sweden and Norway
- Died: 6 September 1972 (aged 73) Oslo, Norway
- Party: Labour
- Spouse: Aud Margot Moe (m. 1926)

Terje Wold (23 August 1899 – 6 September 1972) was a Norwegian judge and politician for the Labour Party.

Terje Wold was born in Evenes Municipality. He graduated as cand.jur. in 1921. He worked as a jurist, becoming a Supreme Court Justice of Norway in 1950. From 1958 to 1969 he was the 15th Chief Justice of the Supreme Court. He was a member of the United Nations War Crimes Commission from 1945 to 1946 and the European Court of Human Rights from 1959 to 1972. He presided at the World Association of Judges from 1969 to 1972.

Wold was appointed Minister of Justice during the cabinet Nygaardsvold, and sat from 1939 to 1945. From 1940 to 1942 he was acting Minister of Trade. He was elected to the Norwegian Parliament from Finnmark in 1945, and served one term. On the local level he had been a member of the city council of Vadsø Municipality from 1925 to 1928 and 1931 to 1936, serving as mayor in 1928 and 1934 to 1936. From 1937 to 1939 he was a member of Tromsø Municipality council.

He published several books. He was appointed Commander with Star of the Order of St. Olav in 1958.

Legal offices
Preceded by Trygve Lie	Norwegian Minister of Justice and the Police; 1939–1945	Succeeded by Johan Cappelen
Preceded by Sverre Grette	Chief Justice of the Supreme Court of Norway; 1958–1969	Succeeded by Rolv Ryssdal
