= Fyksesund Bridge =

Road bridge in Norway

Fyksesund Bridge Fyksesundbrua
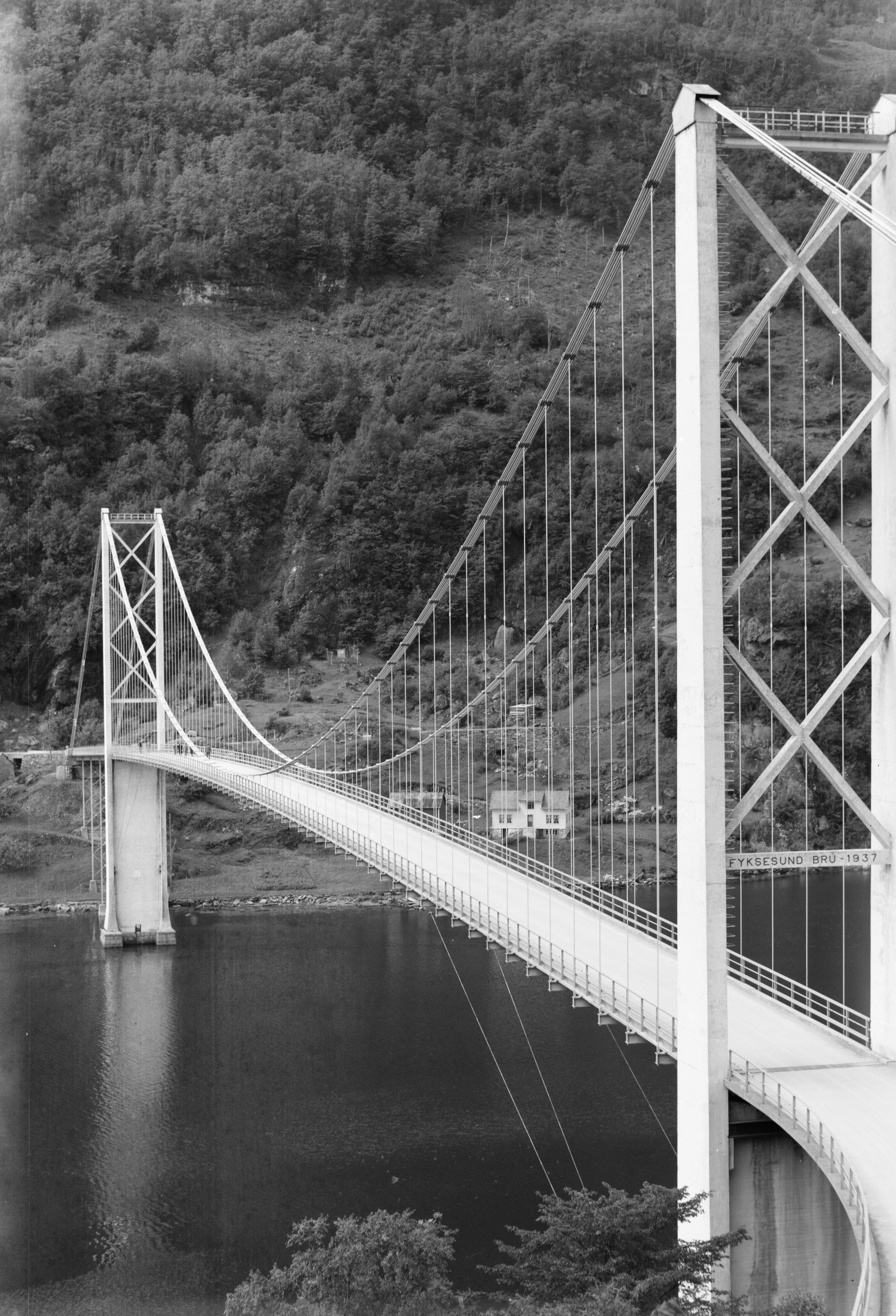
- View of the bridge
- Coordinates: 60°24′00″N 06°15′37″E
- Carries: Fv7
- Locale: Kvam Municipality, Norway

Characteristics
- Design: Suspension bridge
- Material: Reinforced Concrete
- Total length: 344 metres (1,129 ft)
- Width: 1 lane
- Longest span: 230 metres (750 ft)
- Clearance above: 28 metres (92 ft)

History
- Opened: 1937
- Inaugurated: 9 Oct 1937

Location
- Interactive map of Fyksesund Bridge

The Fyksesund Bridge (Norwegian: Fyksesundbrua) is a suspension road bridge in Kvam Municipality in Vestland county, Norway.

The bridge spans the Fyksesund fjord on Norwegian County Road 7, which goes between the villages of Øystese and Ålvik. The bridge is 344 metres (1,129 ft) long and the largest span is 230 metres (750 ft). It was designed by bridge engineer Olaf Stang (1871-1956). The bridge was opened on October 9, 1937 by Olav, the Crown Prince of Norway.

Shortly after opening, the bridge suffered aerodynamic-related structural problems, these were corrected by improvements installed in 1945.

== Gallery ==
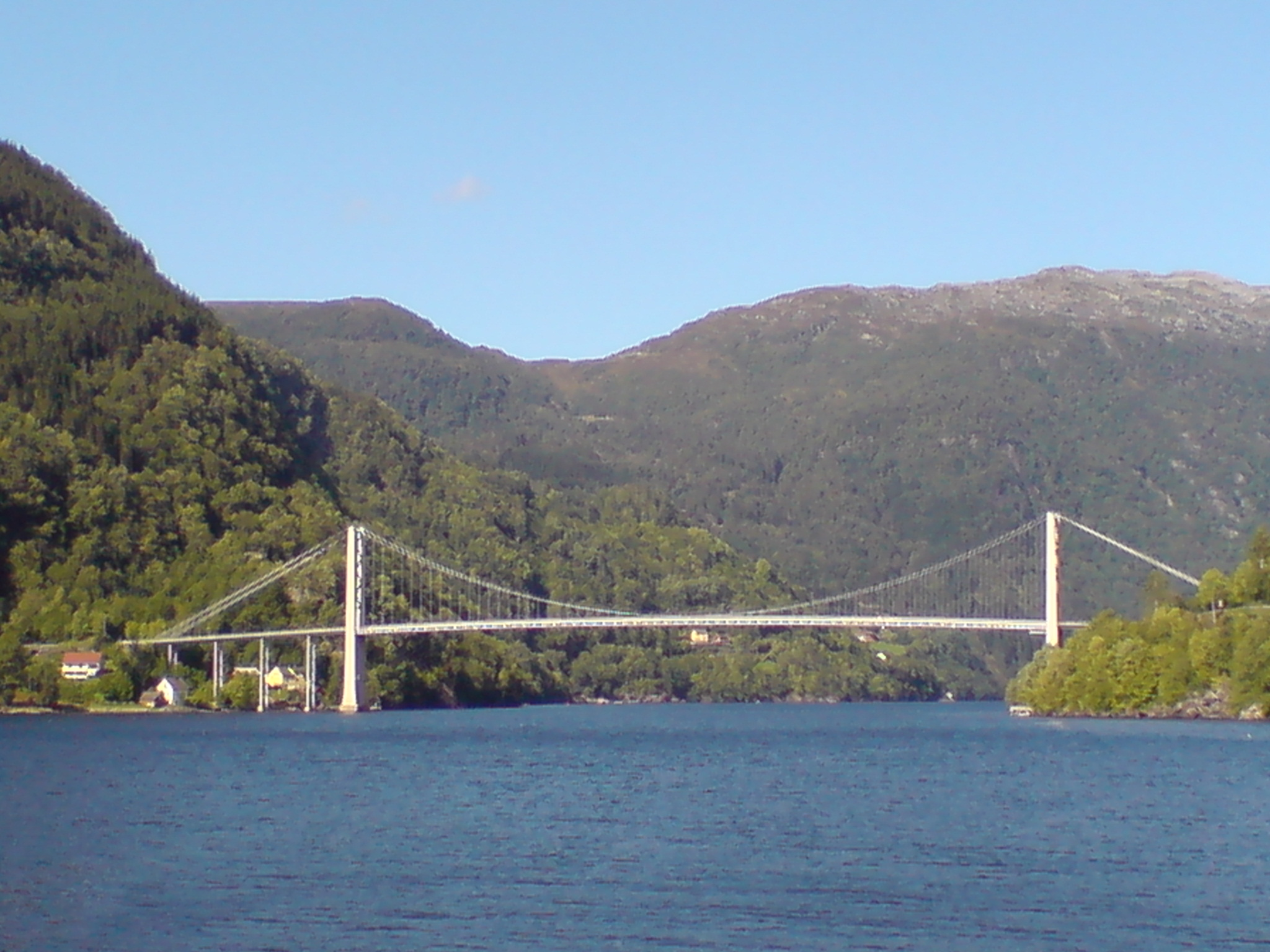

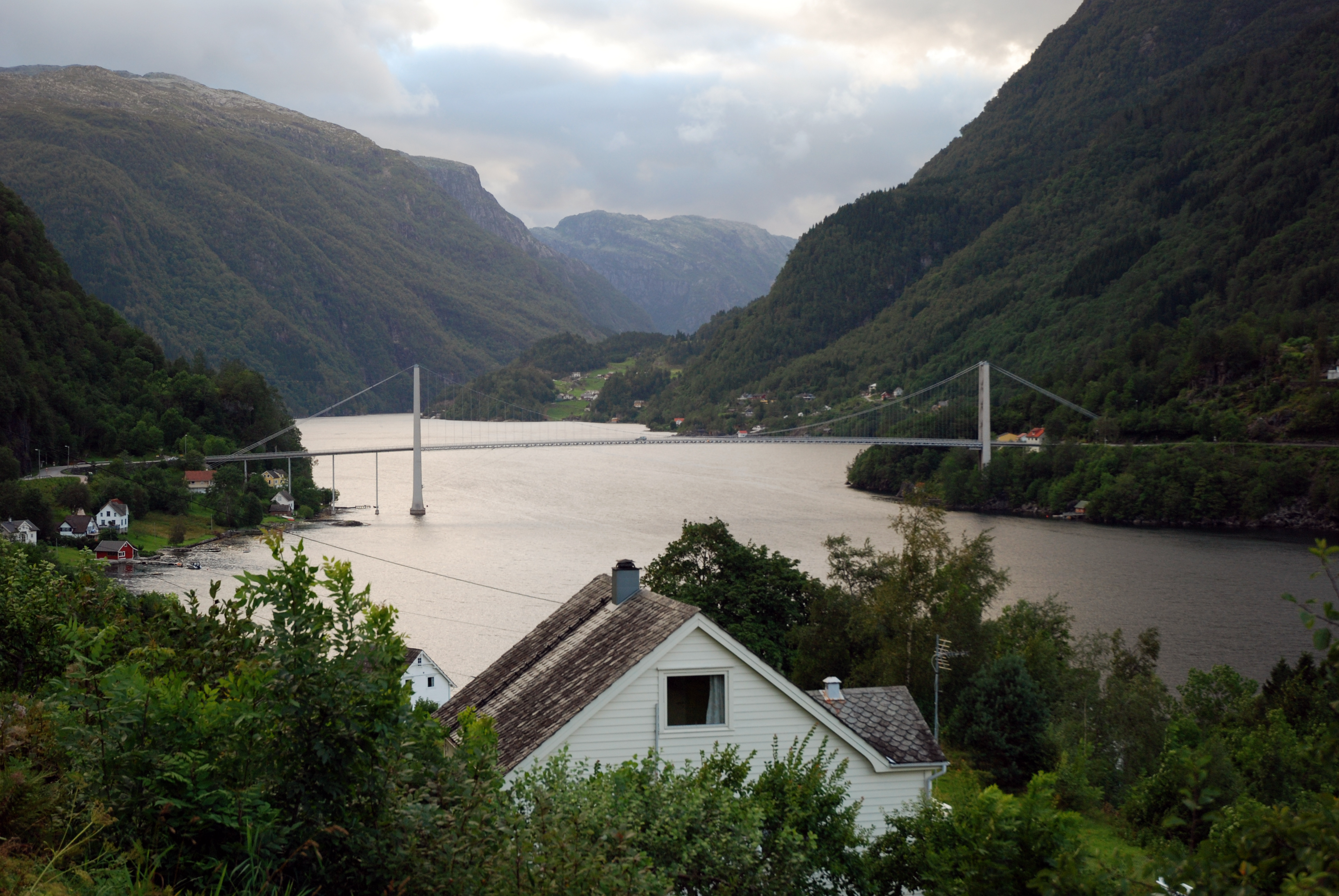

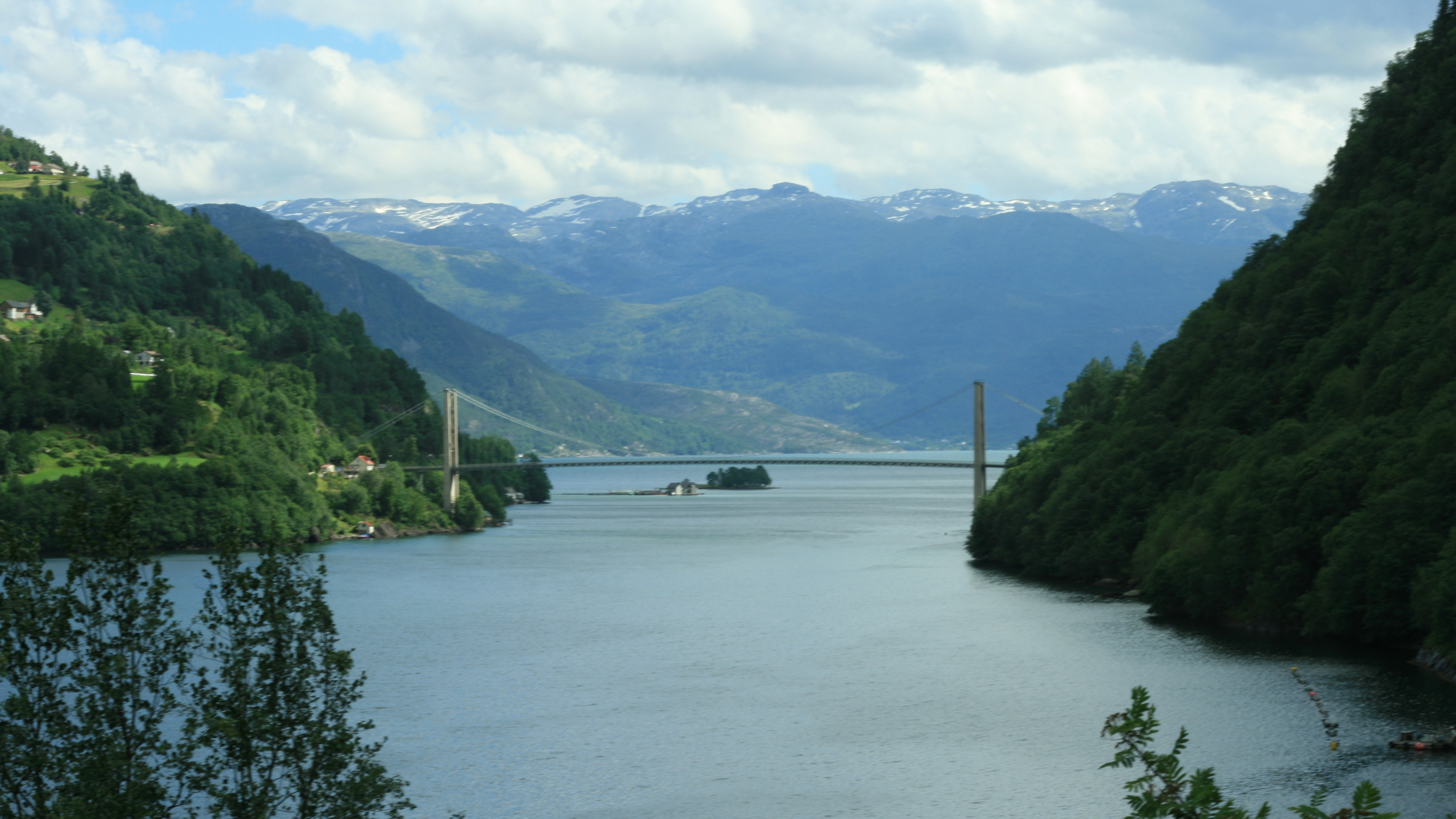

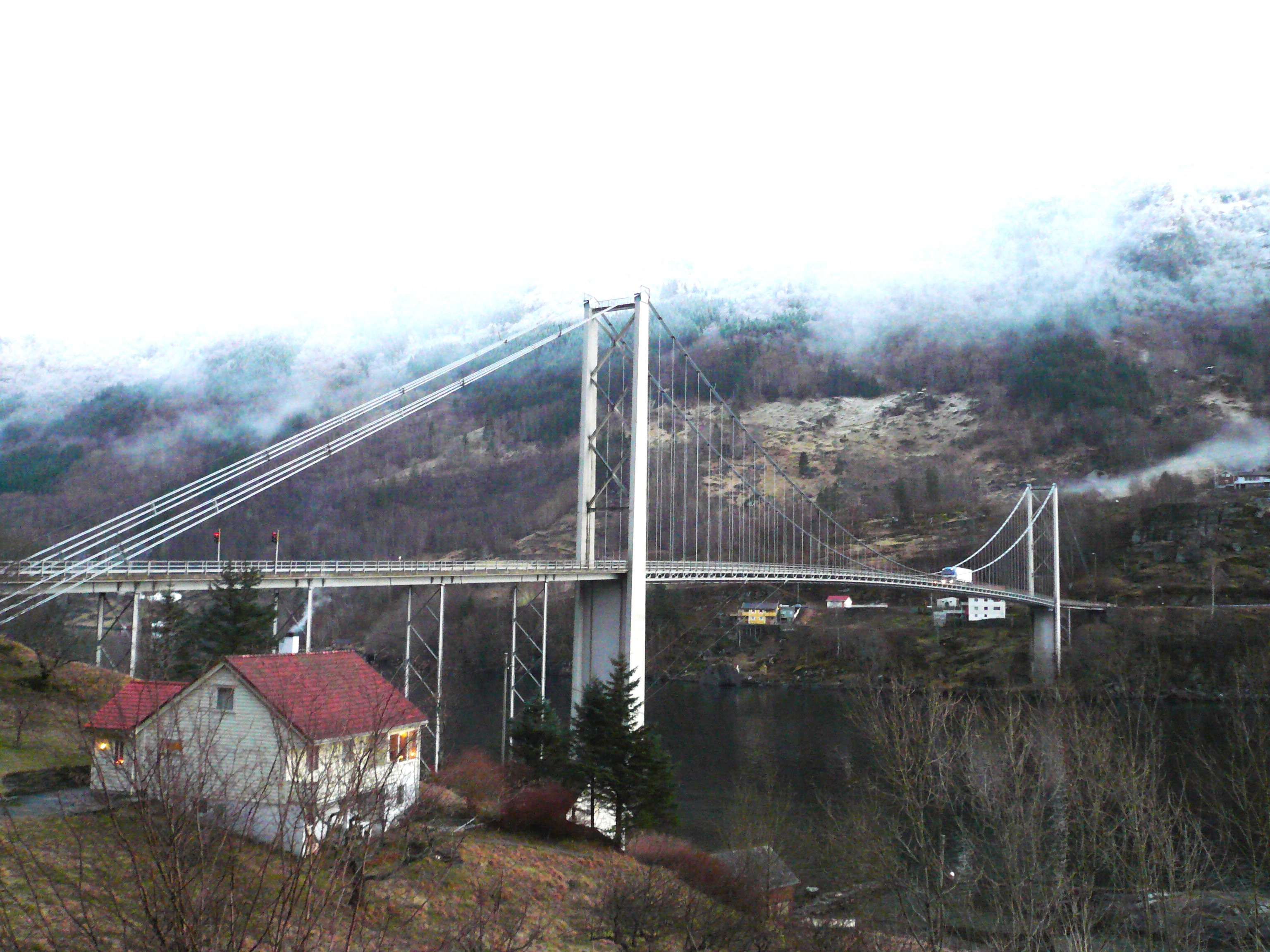
