= Sem Sæland =

Norwegian physicist

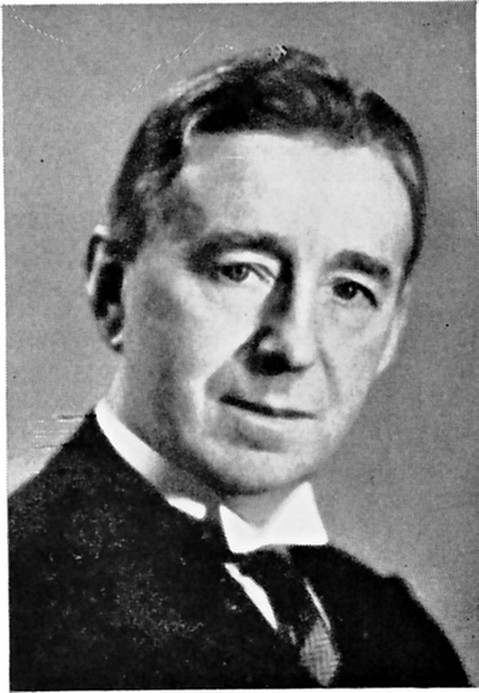
- Born: 17 April 1874; Time Municipality, Norway
- Died: 25 April 1940 (aged 66)
- Occupation: Physicist

Sem Sæland (17 April 1874 – 25 April 1940) was a Norwegian physicist.

== Biography ==
Sæland was a physics Professor at the Norwegian Institute of Technology (NTH) from 1910, and at the University of Oslo from 1922. He served as rector of the University of Oslo from 1927 to 1936. Sæland was a Commander of the Royal Norwegian Order of St. Olav, a Grand Knight of the Order of the Falcon, and a Commander of the Order of the Crown of Italy.

Academic offices
Preceded by Fredrik Stang	Rectors of the University of Oslo; 1927–1936	Succeeded by Didrik Arup Seip
Non-profit organization positions
Preceded by Peter Meinich	Chairman of the Norwegian Polytechnic Society; 1932–1935	Succeeded by H. A. Mørk
