= Nasjonal Samling =

Norwegian far-right political party (1933–1945)

National Gathering Nasjonal Samling
- Abbreviation: NS
- Leader: Vidkun Quisling
- Secretary-General: Rolf Jørgen Fuglesang
- Founded: 13 May 1933
- Dissolved: 8 May 1945
- Preceded by: Nordisk Folkereisning
- Headquarters: Oslo, Norway
- Newspaper: Fritt Folk
- Youth wing: NS Ungdomsfylking
- Women's wing: NS Kvinneorganisasjon
- Paramilitary wing: Hirden
- Trade union: NS Faggruppeorganisasjon
- Farmer wing: NS Bondegrupper
- Membership: 8,000 (1936); 2,500 (1939); 44,000 (1943)
- Ideology: Norwegian nationalism; Fascism; Fascist corporatism
- Political position: Far-right
- Religion: Lutheranism (official)
- International affiliation: Fascist International (1934)
- Colours: Red Gold
- Slogan: Heil og Sæl! ('Health and Happiness')
- Anthem: Norge vårt land ('Norway, our country')

Party flag

The Nasjonal Samling (Norwegian: [nɑʂʊˈnɑːɫ ˈsɑ̂mlɪŋ], NS; lit. 'National Gathering') was a Norwegian far-right political party active from 1933 to 1945. It was the only legal party of Norway from 1942 to 1945. It was founded by former Minister of Defence Vidkun Quisling and a group of supporters such as Johan Bernhard Hjort – who led the party's paramilitary wing (Hirden) for a short time before leaving the party in 1937 after various internal conflicts. The party celebrated its founding on 17 May, Norway's national holiday, but was founded on 13 May 1933. Nasjonal Samling was made illegal and disbanded at the end of World War II in Europe, on 8 May 1945.

== History ==
=== Pre-war politics ===
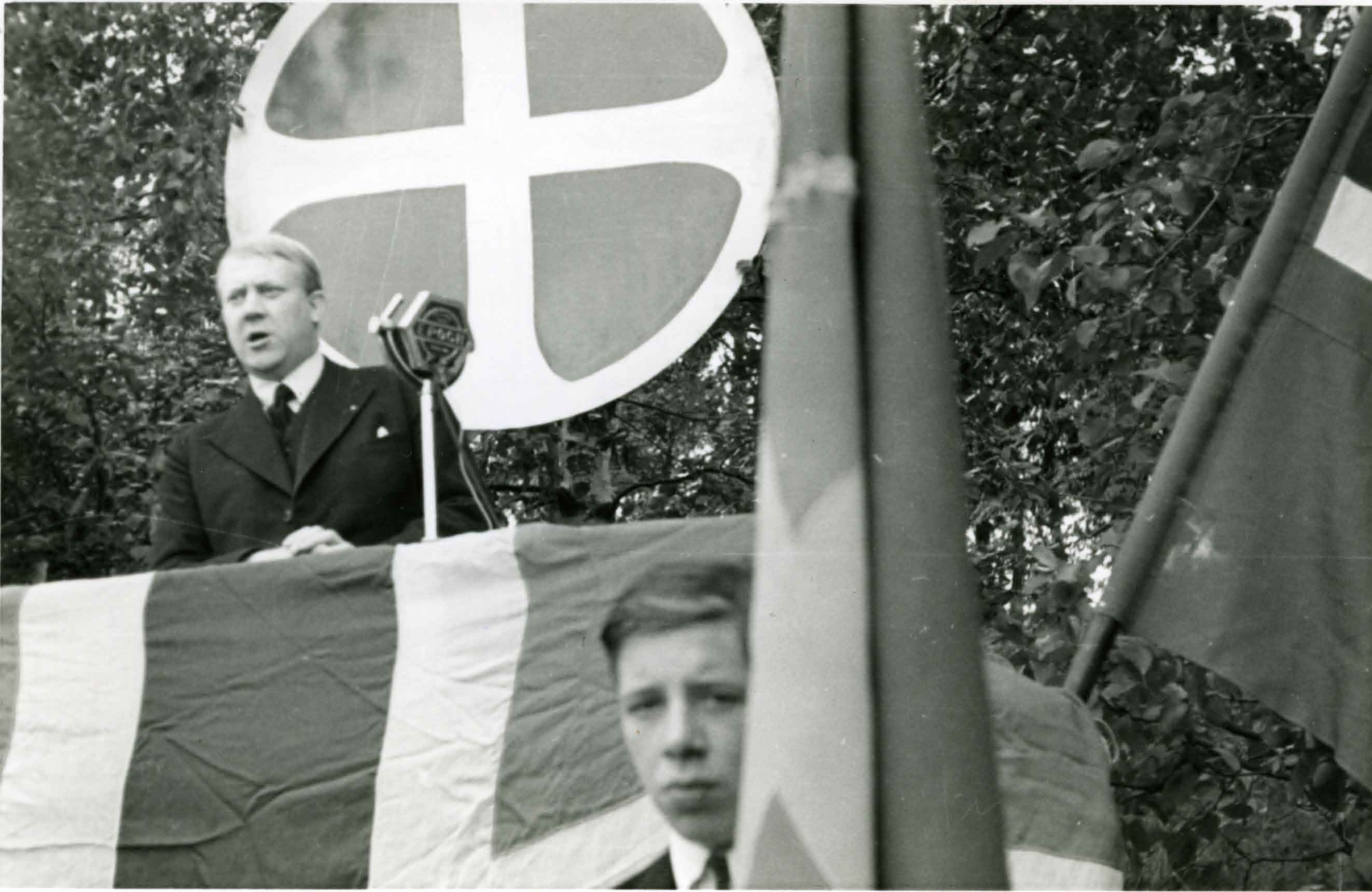
Vidkun Quisling on the podium during a party meeting in the 1930s.

The party never gained direct political influence, but it made its mark on Norwegian politics nonetheless. Despite the fact that it never managed to get more than 2.5% of the vote and failed to elect even one candidate to the Storting, it became a factor by polarising the political scene. The established parties in Norway viewed it as a Norwegian version of the German Nazis, and generally refused to cooperate with it in any way. Several of its marches and rallies before the war were either banned, or marred by violence when communists and socialists clashed with the Hird.

A significant trait of the party throughout its existence was a relatively high level of internal conflict. Antisemitism, anti-Masonry and differing views on religion, as well as the party's association with the Nazis and Germany, were hotly debated, and factionalized the party. By the time the Second World War broke out, the party had around 2,000 members.

Strong belief in Romantic nationalism and authoritarianism dominated the NS ideology. It also relied heavily on Nordic symbolism in its propaganda and speeches. It asserted that its symbol (shown at the head of this article), a golden sun cross on a red background (colours of the coat of arms of Norway), had been the symbol of St. Olaf, painted on his shield.

=== During the German occupation ===
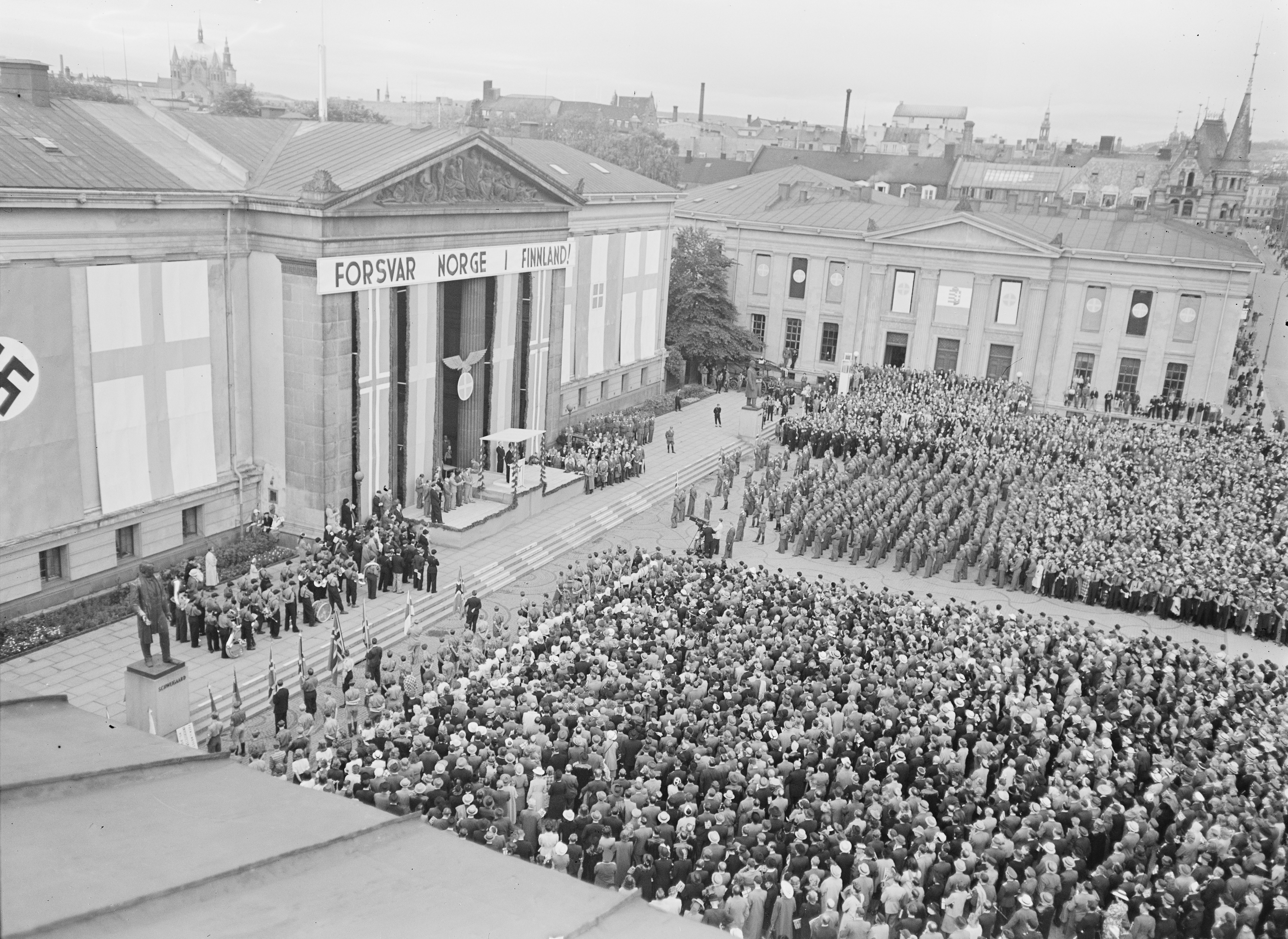
On 4 July 1941, Vidkun Quisling gave a speech at Universitetsplassen in Oslo aimed to recruit volunteers for the Norwegian Legion to fight on the Eastern Front in Finland

When Germany invaded Norway on 9 April 1940, Quisling later that day marched into the Norwegian Broadcasting Corporation studios in Oslo and made a radio broadcast proclaiming himself Prime Minister and ordering all anti-German resistance to end immediately. He claimed that Germany was simply offering Norway "peaceful help" after the Allies mined Norwegian waters, but Prime Minister Johan Nygaardsvold had "irresponsibly fled." However, King Haakon VII, in unoccupied territory along with the Nygaardsvold government, let it be known he would abdicate rather than appoint any government headed by Quisling. The Nygaardsvold government refused to step down in Quisling's favour and confirmed that resistance was to be continued. With no popular support, the German forces of occupation quickly thrust Quisling aside.

In December 1940, Nasjonal Samling membership rose to 22,000, and peaked with around 44,000 in November 1943.

After a brief period with a civilian caretaker government (Administrasjonsrådet) appointed by the Supreme Court, the Germans took control through Reichskommissar Josef Terboven. He appointed a government responsible to himself, with most ministers from the ranks of Nasjonal Samling. However, the party leader, Quisling, was controversial in Norway as well as among the occupiers, and was denied a formal position until 1 February 1942, when he became "minister president" of the "national government". Other important ministers were Jonas Lie (also head of the Norwegian wing of the SS from 1941) as minister of police, Gulbrand Lunde as minister of "popular enlightenment and propaganda", and the opera singer Albert Viljam Hagelin, who was Minister of Home Affairs. The NS administration had a certain amount of autonomy in purely civilian matters, but it was in reality controlled by Reichskommissar Terboven as "head of state", subordinate only to Adolf Hitler.

=== Post-war ===
The post-war authorities proscribed the party and prosecuted its members as collaborators. Nearly 50,000 were brought to trial, approximately half of whom received prison sentences. The authorities executed Quisling for treason as well as a few other high-profile NS members, and prominent German officials in Norway, for war crimes. The sentences' lawfulness has been questioned, however, as Norway did not have capital punishment in peace-time, and the Norwegian constitution at the time stipulated that capital punishment for war crimes had to be carried out during actual wartime.

Another issue of post-war treatment has been the ongoing Hamsun debate in Norway. The author Knut Hamsun, although never a member, was a well-known NS sympathiser. After the war, Hamsun was, however, deemed mentally unfit to stand trial, and the issue of his links to the party has never been properly resolved. Hamsun's status as a Nobel Prize laureate also results in his ties to NS being a sensitive subject.

== Programme of Nasjonal Samling (excerpt) ==
The 30-point Programme of Nasjonal Samling was undersigned by Vidkun Quisling on 15 February 1934. Excerpt:

1. The National Government to act independently of party politics.

8. Everybody to have the right and duty to work. Brain-work and manual labour to be equally respected.

9. Private enterprise and property rights to be protected within the framework of economically planned organisations for trade and production. All national resources to be utilised. The State and Communities not to engage in trade or industry on their own account, unless social considerations demand it. Co-operative trade to be non-political.

13. A rational monetary system to be established on a fixed level of value so that work is properly rewarded.

14. Banking services to be changed in accordance with the demands of the time. Nationwide credit to be made available to enterprises large and small. Capital to serve the productive life of the country, and interest rates to be reduced. Unsound speculation and too much reward for too little work to be stopped. Savings, old-age pensions and life insurances to be promoted and protected.

15. A national agricultural policy to promote a class of large and small freehold farmers, to secure the national food supply, to facilitate new cultivation and to encourage the building of new farms. Debts to be settled, prices and distribution to be arranged, taxes and dues to be regulated so as to make agriculture pay.

19. Responsibility for the maintenance of living standards to be strengthened. Everybody to be placed so as to use his or her gifts and abilities to the advantage of all.

20. The family and home to be protected. Respect for women's homework and motherhood to be raised. Equal political and employment rights for men and women. Economic support for children and the disabled to be achieved. Old-age pensions for all.

22. The fundamental value of the Christian religion to be protected.

23. Better and quicker school education, with special attention to the formation of character, social consciousness, physical development and practical life. A general school plan offering full facilities for pupils to specialise according to their gifts and their plans for the future—in accordance with the needs of society. The State to pay for pupils with special gifts. Research institutes and specialised schools to be founded and developed.

25. The press, theatres, cinemas, broadcasting and other cultural institutions to support the interests of the nation. Anti-social propaganda and the spreading of class-hatred to be strictly forbidden.

30. Large contributions to be made towards the world community of nations. Norwegian foreign policy to seek worldwide connections with related peoples in culture, race and interests. Everywhere, however, the interests of the nation to precede the interests of individuals, parties and countries.

== Uniforms (1940–1945) ==
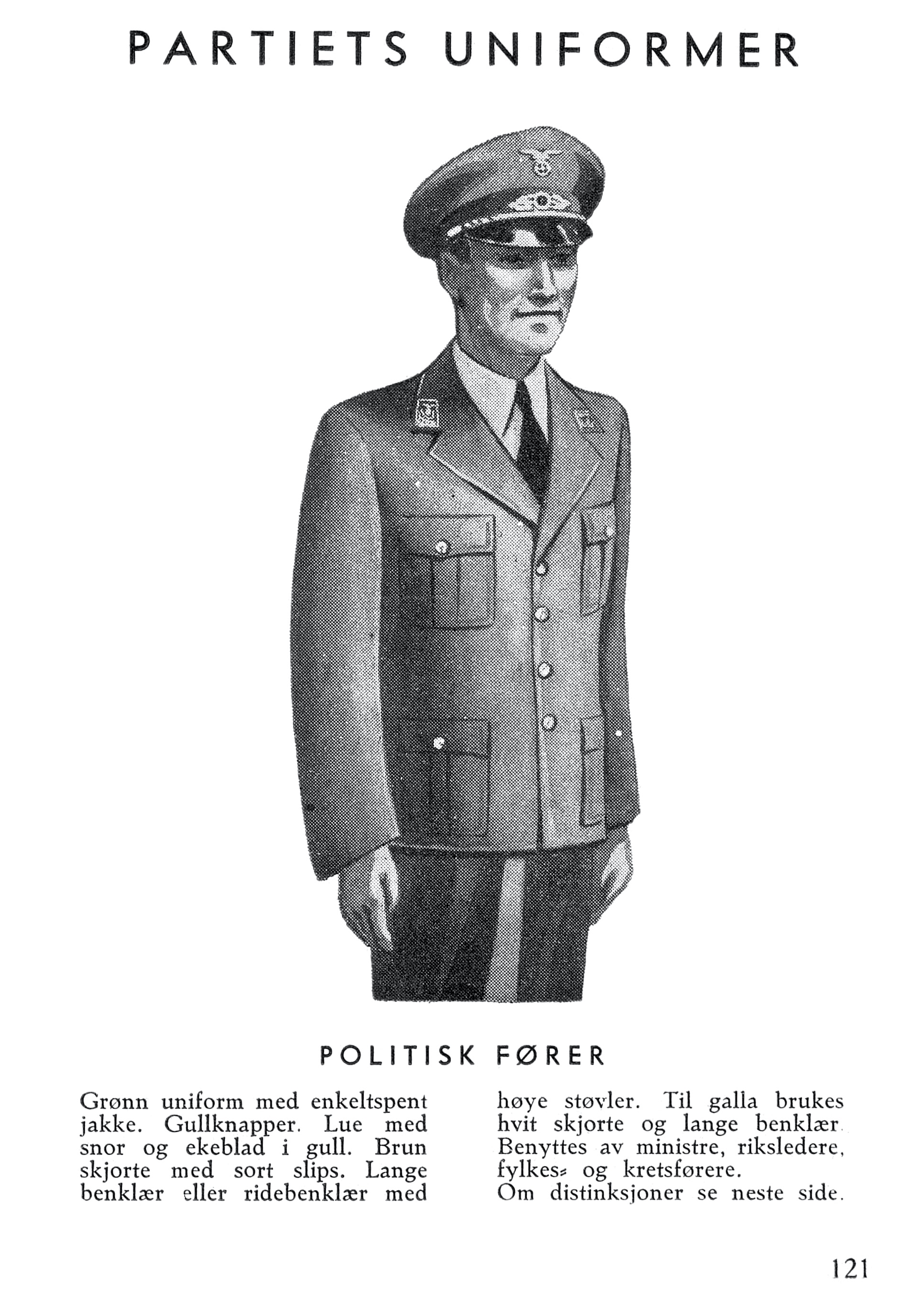
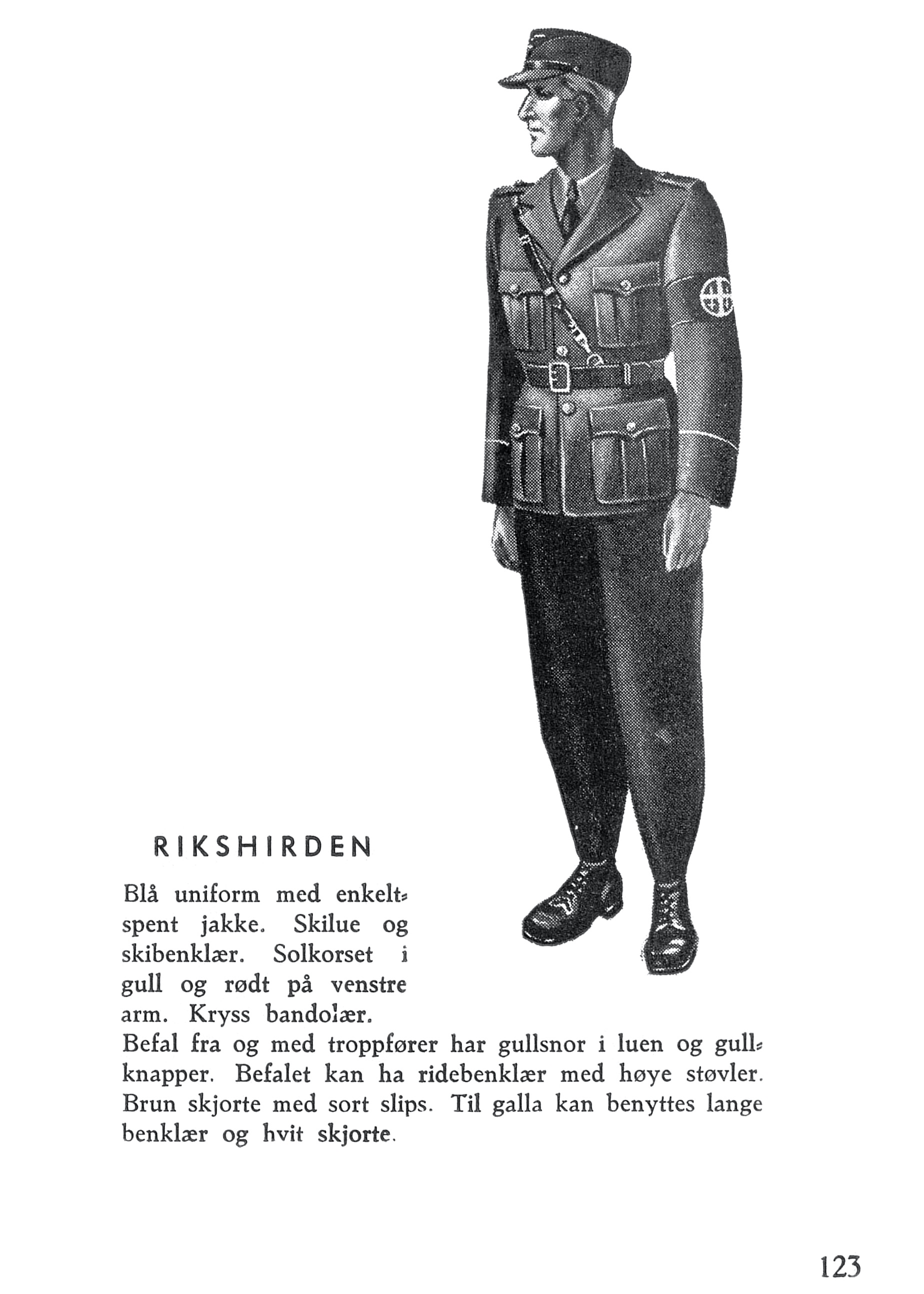
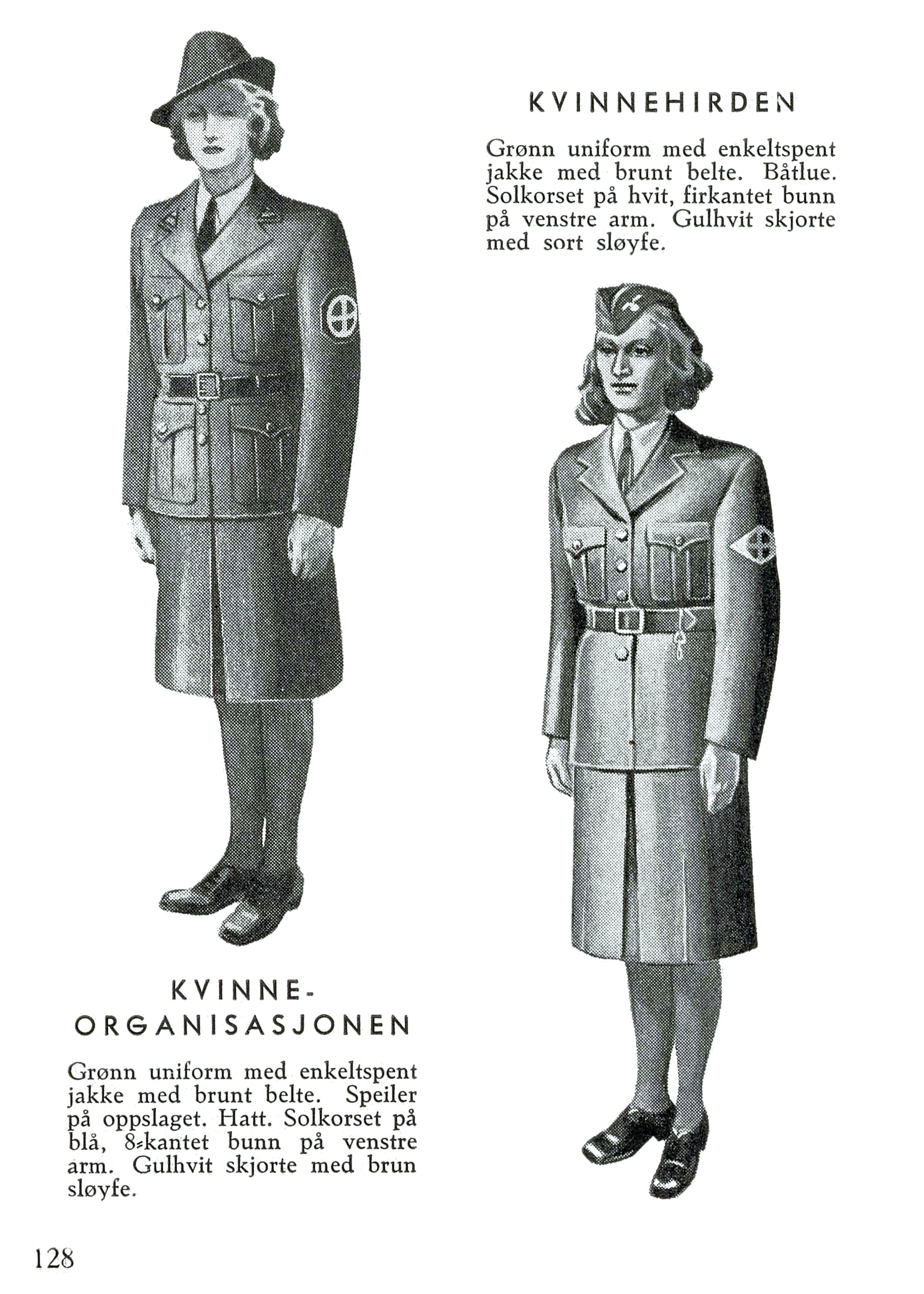
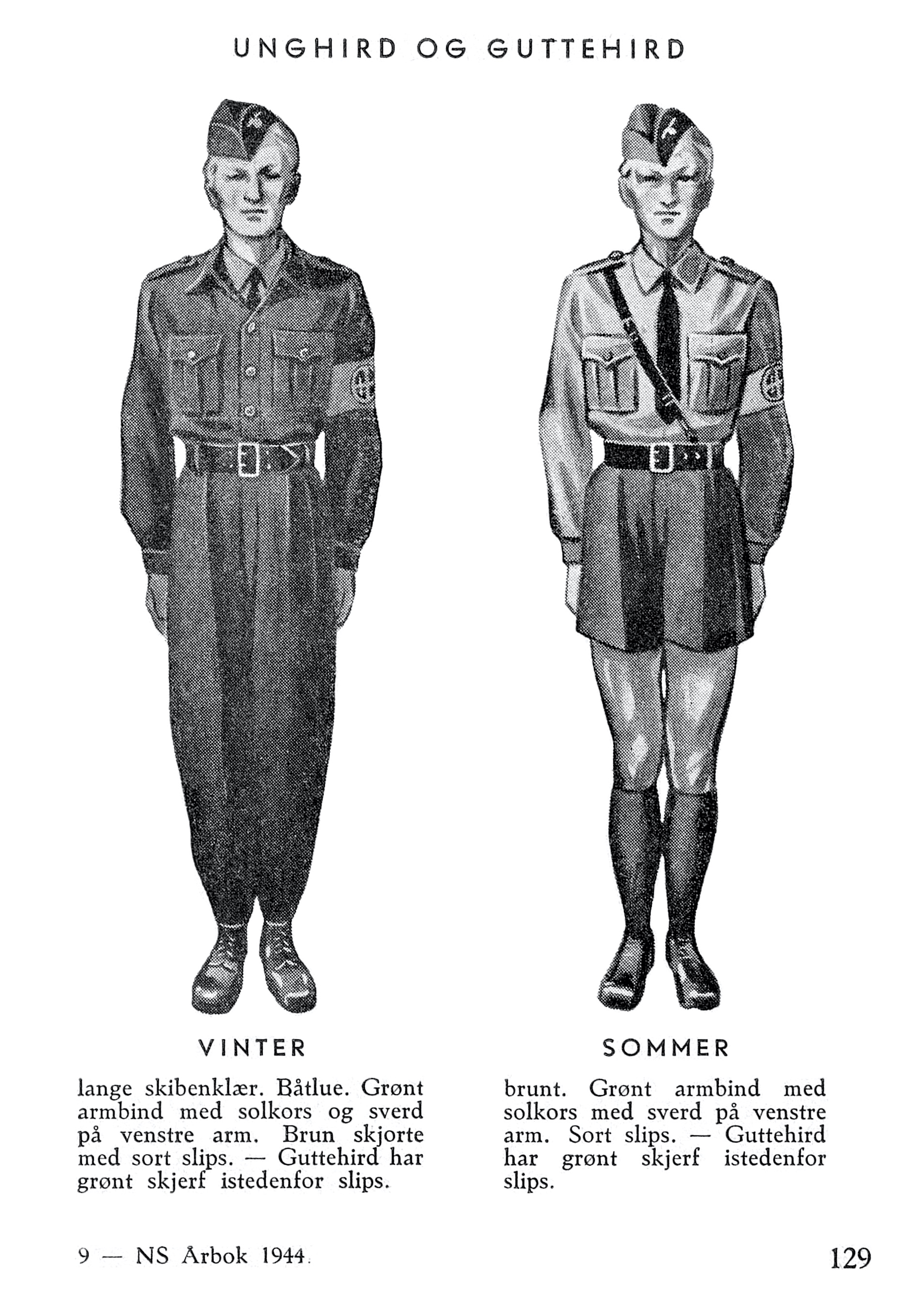
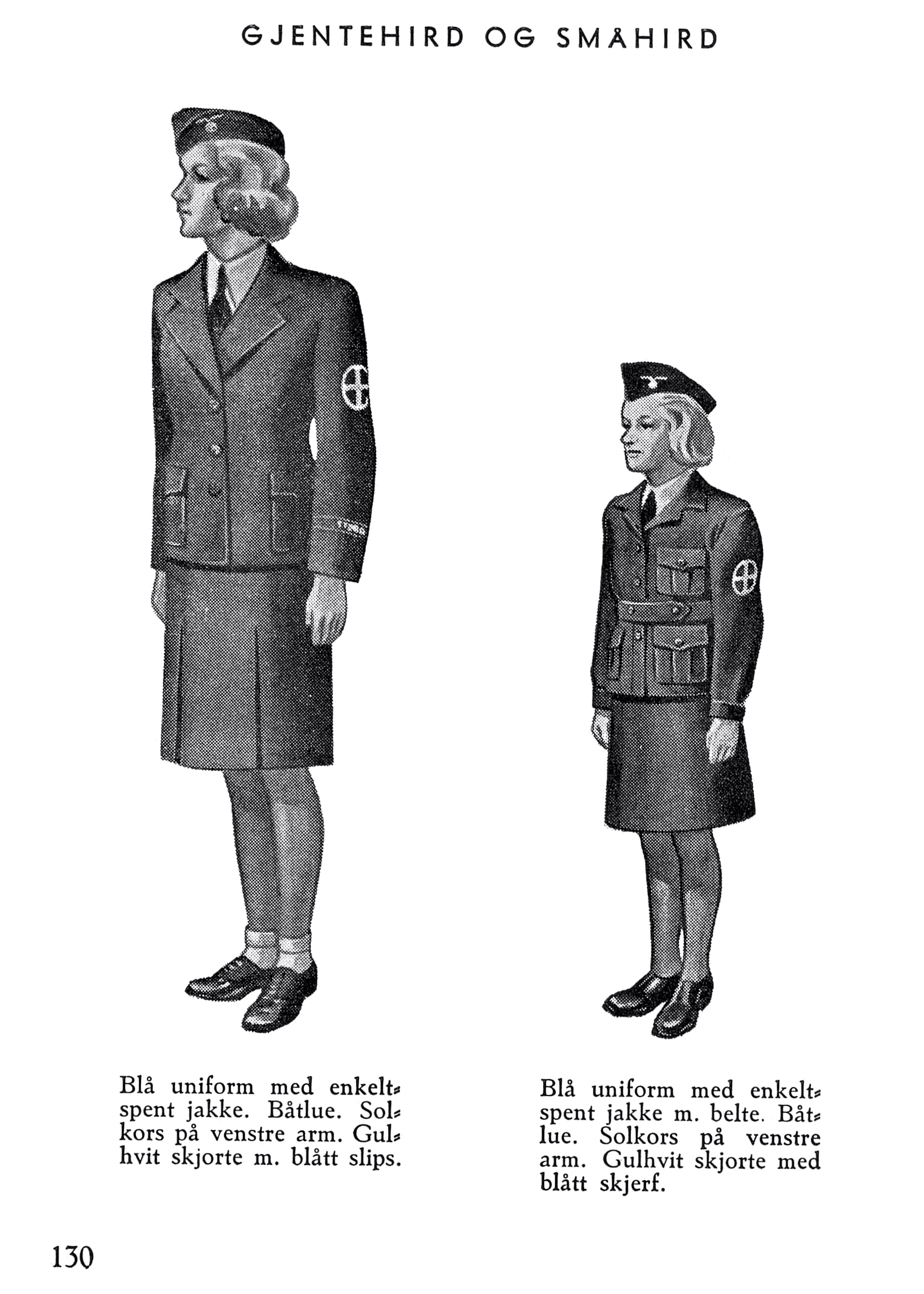
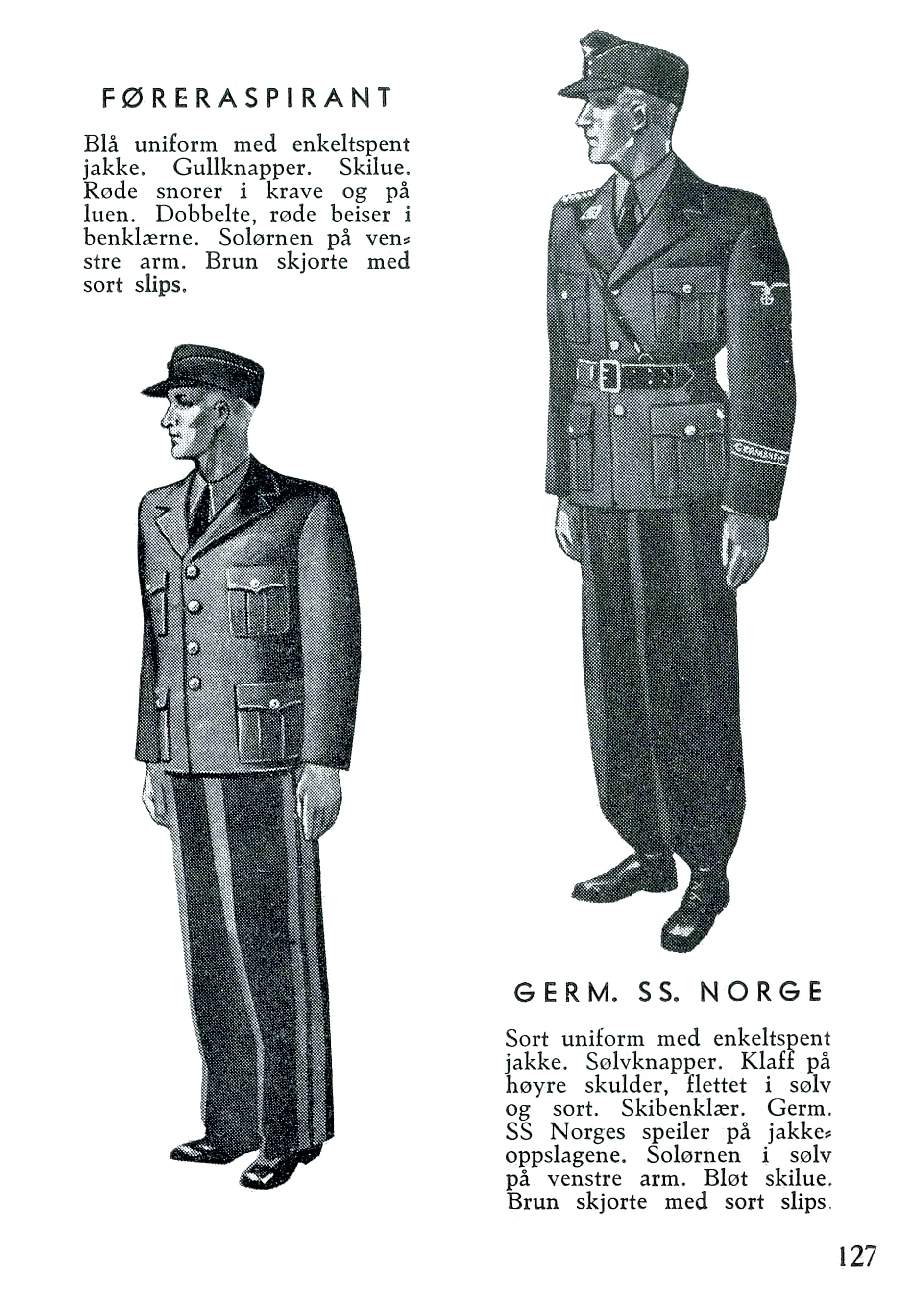
From left to right: Party leadership uniform, Hird uniform, Female Hird uniform, NSUF youth uniform, and of føreraspirant and Germanske SS Norge.

== Parliamentary elections ==
Date	Votes			Seats		Position	Size
Date	#	%	± pp	#	±	Position	Size
1933	27,850	2.2%	+ 2.2	0 / 150	Steady		5th
1936	26,577	1.8%	– 0.4	0 / 150	Steady		6th
