= Maarud =

Norwegian snack food company

Maarud AS
- Type: Aksjeselskap
- Industry: Snacks
- Founded: 1936 (90 years ago)
- Headquarters: Disenå, Norway
- Area served: Norway; Sweden; Finland; Baltic states
- Owner: Intersnack
- Number of employees: 201 (2022)
- Website: www.maarud.no

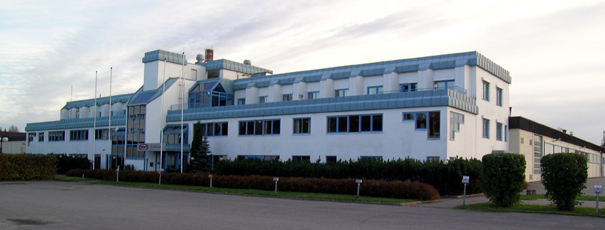
Maarud fabrikker, part of Kraft Foods, Disenå, Sør-Odal, Hedmark, Norway

Maarud AS (Norwegian: [ˈmɑːrʉd]) is a Norwegian manufacturer of snack foods.

== Structure ==
Their most well known product are various potato chips, branded as "Maarud Potetgull" (lit. 'potato gold'), but the company also produces other foods such as tortilla chips, peanuts, and popcorn. The company also has branches in Sweden, Finland and the Baltic states under the names "Estrella" and "Taffel" (in Lithuania).

The Norwegian branch has the main office in Oslo and production facilities are at Disenå in Sør-Odal Municipality. The Swedish company has the main office in Stockholm and production facilities at Angered. The Baltic division has production facilities in Kaunas, Lithuania.

The company has 201 employees.

== History ==
The company traces back to 1928, when Thomas Stang of the Maarud farm at Disenå started selling farm products. Production of potato chips under the brand name "potetgull" started in 1936, after Stang had visited the United States. Around 1950, Maarud purchased industrial equipment for larger scale chip production, and the company enjoyed progress in the 1960s, helped by the advent of television. In the 1970s, Maarud became the largest snack food producer in Scandinavia.

Thomas Stang's son Ole A. Stang, Jr. took over the company in 1960. The company was sold to Freia in 1983, and to Kraft Foods in 1992. After operating as a daughter company of Kraft for several years, the company merged with Kraft and Freia in 2002, becoming Kraft Foods Norge.

Under Kraft, Maarud had trouble maintaining their position in the market. In the tough competition against KiMs, Maarud's share of the Norwegian potato chip market fell from 50% in 2001, to 33% in 2008, although the increase in consumption of snack foods meant that production at Maarud remained stable. In 2008, Kraft sold the company to the Norwegian private equity firm Herkules Capital. The sale was welcomed by both local and national politicians in Norway, as well as the employees of Maarud.

In 2014, Herkules sold Estrella Maarud to the Intersnack Group, which combines various international brands of salted snacks.

== See also ==
- List of brand name snack foods
