= Nicholas Stang =

Canadian philosopher

Nicholas F. Stang

Philosophical work
- Era: 21st-century philosophy
- Region: Western philosophy
- School: Kantian philosophy
- Institutions: University of Toronto
- Main interests: 19th Century Philosophy, Aesthetics, Early Modern Philosophy, Kant, Metaphysics
- Website: https://sites.google.com/site/nickstang

Nicholas F. Stang is a Canadian-American philosopher and professor of philosophy at the University of Toronto. Stang is known for his works on Kantian philosophy.

== Books ==
- Kant's Modal Metaphysics, Oxford University Press, 2016, 352pp., ISBN 9780198712626.
