= Wenche Foss =

Norwegian diva, actress, singer, recording artist (1917–2011)

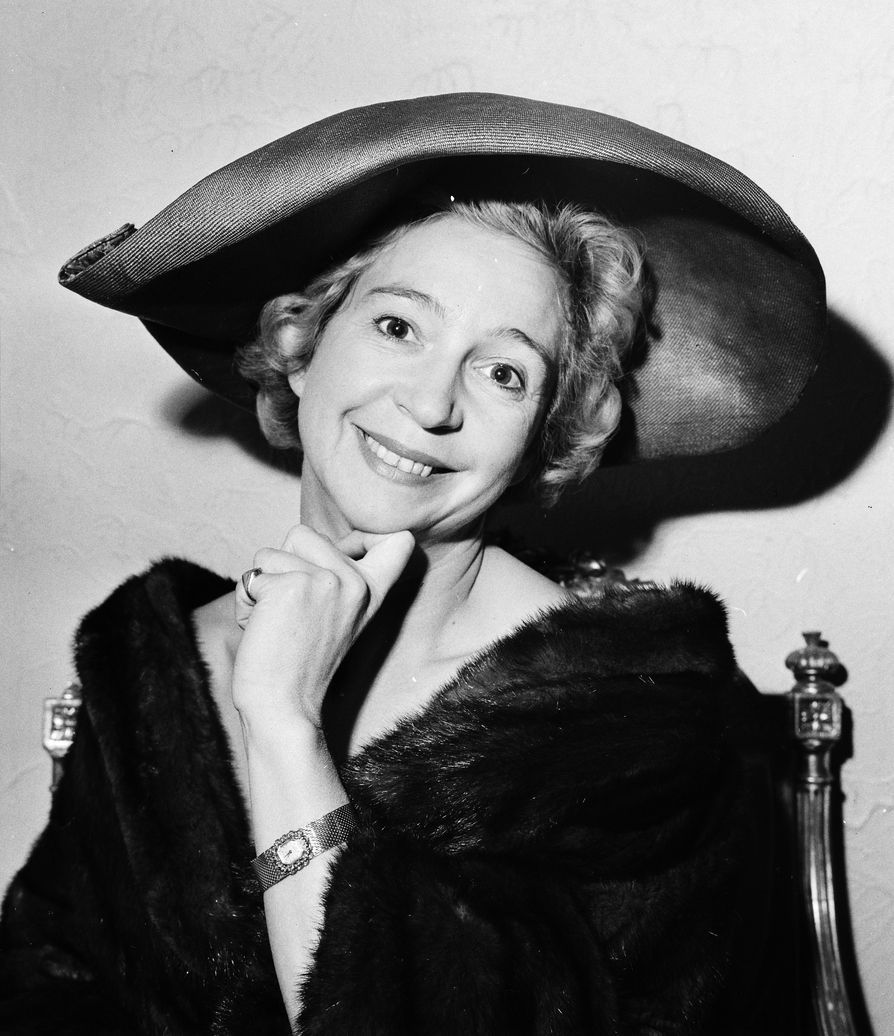
- Foss in 1959
- Born: Eva Wenche Steenfeldt-Foss; 5 December 1917; Kristiania, Norway
- Died: 28 March 2011 (aged 93); Oslo, Norway
- Other name: Eva Wenche Steenfeldt Foss Stang
- Occupation: Actress
- Years active: 1935–2011
- Spouse(s): Alf Scott-Hansen; Thomas Stang

Eva Wenche Steenfeldt Stang (5 December 1917 – 28 March 2011), better known as Wenche Foss (Norwegian: [ˈvɛ̂ŋkə ˈfɔsː]), was a leading Norwegian actress of stage, screen and television.

== Personal life ==
Wenche Foss was born to engineer Christian August Steenfeldt-Foss (1878–1960) and Alfhild Røren. Foss grew up with an atheist mother and a devout Christian father; she inherited both views but has stated: "I could not fall asleep without the prayer."

Her first marriage was to engineer and film producer Alf Scott-Hansen (1903–1961), a son of port director Alf Scott-Hansen, but the marriage was dissolved. In 1953 she married landowner and industrialist Thomas Stang (1897–1982), thus becoming a sister-in-law of Axel Heiberg Stang and daughter-in-law of Ole A. Stang and Emma Heiberg. Her son Fabian Stang was mayor of Oslo from 2007 to 2015.

== Career ==
Foss made her stage debut in 1935 as Ingrid in Vilhelm Dybwad's operetta Taterblod. She was subsequently part of the ensemble at the Carl Johan Teater from 1936 to 1939, and then became a central figure in Centralteatret. She received acclaim in a number of leading roles. Her breakthrough role was in Carl Erik Soya's To tråder. Later she played numerous leading roles in the ensembles of Nationaltheatret and Oslo Nye Teater, being a regular at Nationaltheatret since 1952.

Foss was also an accomplished vocalist (mezzo-soprano) who received classical training with M. Hviid and K. B. Børresen. Her performances in Emmerich Kálmán's operetta Die Bajadere, Eduard Künneke's Der Vetter aus Dingsda, Franz Lehár's operettas Der Graf von Luxemburg and The Merry Widow, in which she played the title role. She pioneered musical parts in such musicals as Kiss Me, Kate, Cabaret and Hello, Dolly.

Foss also took the occasional role as a voice actress. She provided the voice of Enkefru Stengelføhn-Glad in the 1975 animated feature film Flåklypa Grand Prix, known in English as Pinchcliffe Grand Prix. She voiced the same character in another animated feature, 1998's Solan, Ludvig og Gurin med reverompa (Gurin with the Foxtail).

== Activist and humanitarian ==
In 1953, Foss gave birth to a child with Down syndrome who died at a young age. She is credited with raising public awareness about disabled individuals, founding, among other things, the vacation resort "Solgården" ("Hacienda del Sol") in Alicante, Spain.

She survived breast cancer in 1971 and wrote a candid account of her experience. She was a strong supporter of gay rights and an outspoken critic of the Christian Democratic Party owing to its opposition to gay marriage and gay rights. She also questioned the raison d'être of the party, maintaining that "religion and politics should not be mixed".

== Death and recognition ==
Foss was decorated as a Commander of the Order of St. Olav in 1972. In 1988 she was promoted to Commander with Star in the same order. She was one of few Norwegian civilians to hold such a high rank in the King's order of chivalry. She has also been awarded the Red Cross Badge of Honour and appointed a Knight of the Order of the Dannebrog.

Foss received a number of accolades, among them the Hedda Award, an honorary Amanda prize, and Toleranseprisen. In 2007, Queen Sonja of Norway unveiled Per Ung's statue of Foss outside Norway's National Theater. She was awarded the Ibsen Centennial Commemoration Award in 2006.

On 2 December 2010, Wenche Foss announced that she was seriously ill and did not expect to live past New Year. She died in her sleep on 28 March 2011 at Diakonhjemmet Hospital in Oslo, surrounded by her family.

Her death saw an outpour of public grief and tributes rarely bestowed upon civilians. The Norwegian government announced she would be buried with government honour at state expense, the fifth woman in Norwegian history to be given this respect. The funeral was broadcast live on national television, 4 April 2011, and was, in keeping with Foss' own wishes, open to the public. It was also attended by King Harald and Queen Sonja of Norway, as well as Prime Minister Jens Stoltenberg and other prominent members of government.

Foss is depicted on the tail fin of a Norwegian Air Shuttle Boeing 737-800, with the registration SE-RXD.

== Selected filmography ==
- 1940: Tørres Snørtevold
- 1942: En herre med bart
- 1942: Jeg drepte!
- 1942: The Dangerous Game
- 1945: Rikard Nordraak
- 1946: Et spøkelse forelsker seg
- 1948: Trollfossen
- 1951: Kranes konditori
- 1952: Det kunne vært deg
- 1953: Ung frue forsvunnet
- 1959: Støv på hjernen
- 1959: Herren og hans tjenere
- 1962: Tonny
- 1963: Om Tilla
- 1974: Bør Børson Jr.
- 1975: Flåklypa Grand Prix (voice of Enkefru Stengenfhøn-Glad)
- 1980: Life and Death
- 1982: Victoria L
- 2006: En udødelig mann (Kristine Cathrine Ploug)
