= Axel Heiberg Stang =

Norwegian landowner and forester (1904–1974)

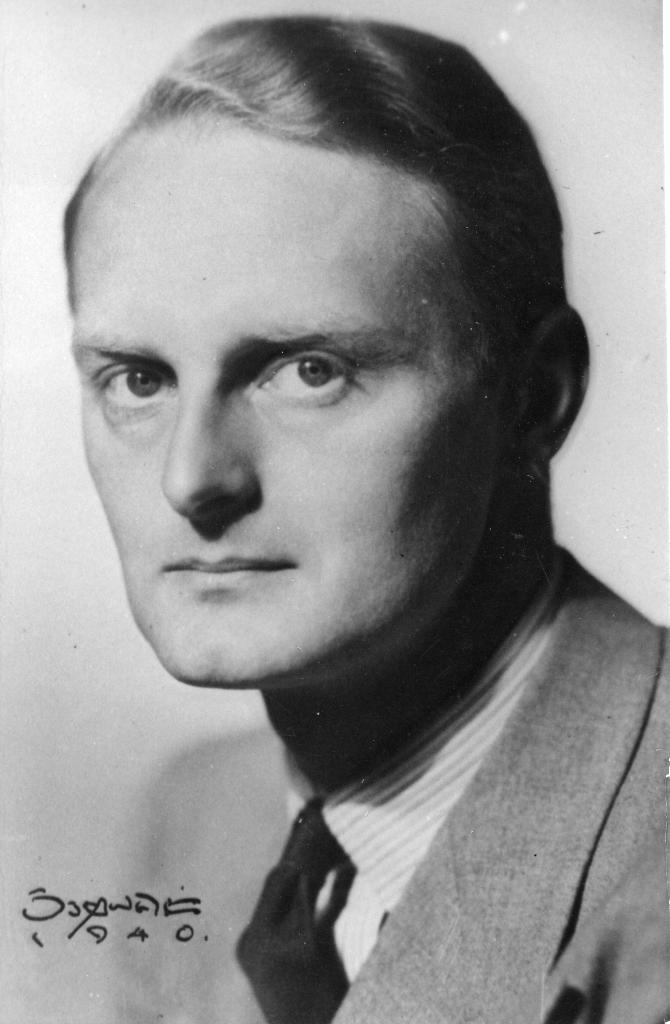
- Axel Stang in 1940

Personal details
- Born: 21 February 1904 Oslo, Norway
- Died: 11 October 1974 (aged 70) Rømskog, Norway
- Party: Nasjonal Samling (1933–1945)
- Spouse: Helene Forseth Fretheim
- Parent(s): Ole A. Stang; Emma Stang
- Relatives: Thomas Stang (brother); Wenche Foss (sister-in-law); Axel Heiberg (grandfather); Mads Wiel Stang (grandfather); Thorvald Meyer (great-grandfather); Andreas Tofte (great-great-grandfather); Jørgen Breder Stang (uncle); Fabian Stang (nephew); Heddy Astrup (cousin); Emil Stang (cousin)
- Military Service
- Allegiance: Nazi Germany
- Branch: Waffen-SS
- Units: 6th SS Mountain Division Nord; 11th SS Volunteer Panzergrenadier Division Nordland
- Conflicts: Second World War; Continuation War; Balkans Campaign
- Awards: Iron Cross, 2nd Class

Axel Heiberg Stang (21 February 1904 – 11 October 1974) was a Norwegian landowner and forester who served as a councillor of state, and later a minister, in the Nasjonal Samling government of Vidkun Quisling.

== Early life and career ==
He was born in Kristiania into two of Norway's most wealthy and politically-influential families, with large estates. His father Ole A. Stang was a businessman and landowner, while his mother Emma Heiberg was a trusted confidante and mistress of Queen Maud. His brother was Thomas Stang, and thus Axel was brother-in-law to actress Wenche Foss and uncle to the former mayor of Oslo Fabian Stang.

== Political life ==
Stang first joined the Nasjonal Samling (NS) in 1933 and served as district leader in Glåmdal, although he was largely a minor figure before World War II. After the invasion of Norway in April 1940 he was put in joint charge of the NS political staff with Ragnar Skancke. The Germans thought it wise to include him due to his family's close ties to the royal court and recommended that he be a part of the new government despite his lack of experience and commitment.

In September he was appointed to Vidkun Quisling's collaborationist government as Minister of Labour and Sports, a heavily ideological department. In this role he passed a law making service in the Arbeidstjenesten (modeled after the German Reichsarbeitsdienst) compulsory in 1941. He also made service of all children in the "NSUF" (modeled after the Hitlerjugend) compulsory; this proved a disaster as it infuriated the population and was later scrapped altogether. His attempts to force all sports clubs to join the Nasjonal Samling Sports Organisation similarly proved a failure, leading to an almost total boycott of organised sport for the duration of the occupation.

Whilst continuing as a minister, he enrolled in the SS Division Nordland, and won the Iron Cross Second Class after seeing action in the Balkans. He also served eight weeks at the Eastern Front in Finland during the summer of 1941.

He was generally considered to be moderate and amicable among contemporaries, but unable to resist either his German advisors or the Norwegian hardliners in the government.

== Later life ==
After the war, in 1946, he was sentenced to life in prison for his involvement in collaboration, which was subsequently commuted to 20 years of hard labour. At his appeal to the Supreme Court of Norway, a minority of three judges voted for a death sentence, among them his own cousin, Emil Stang. He received a full pardon in 1956 and retired to his estate at Rømskog, where he remained until his death.
