= Thomas Stang =

Norwegian forester and businessperson (1897–1982)

- Born: November 27, 1897; Oslo, Norway
- Died: January 5, 1982 (aged 84)
- Resting place: Ullern Cemetery, Oslo
- Spouse: Wenche Foss
- Children: Ole A. Stang, Jr. Fabian Stang
- Parent(s): Ole A. Stang; Emma Heiberg
- Relatives: Axel Heiberg Stang (brother); Axel Heiberg (grandfather); Mads Wiel Stang (grandfather)

Thomas Stang (27 November 1897 – 5 January 1982) was a Norwegian forester and businessperson. He is known as founder of the company Maarud, and also as husband of actress Wenche Foss.

== Personal life ==
He was born in Kristiania as a son of landowner Ole A. Stang and Emma Heiberg. He was a brother of Axel Heiberg Stang, nephew of ship-owner Jørgen Breder Stang, grandson of landowner Mads Wiel Stang and politician Axel Heiberg.

He was the father of landowner and industrialist Ole A. Stang, Jr., born 1923. He later married actress Wenche Foss in 1953. Lawyer and politician Fabian Stang is their son.

== Career ==
In his early life, Stang took the examen artium before working in forestry and timber business. He was a forest laborer for one year before taking forester education in Norway and the United States. He worked in Paris for Konow & Smith, then for one year at Moss Cellulosefabrik.

The property Maarud in Sør-Odal Municipality had been bought by his father in 1911. From 1923 Thomas Stang operated the farm and woodland at Maarud. Out of this business he developed an industrial company of the same name, Maarud Bedrifter. After a stint as chief executive officer of Union Co from 1939 to 1945, he returned to Maarud Bedrifter. The company took up potato chip production in 1952, and also specialized in cheese, other dairy products and eggs. The forests yielded timber to produce readymade houses and cabins.

Maarud was taken over by his son Ole Stang, Jr. in 1960. Stang, who cited American industrialism as a major inspiration, still continued to venture into new business ideas. Among others was a pioneer in selling products such as bottled springwater and jerky on the Norwegian market.

Stang was a deputy supervisory council member of Forsikringsselskapet Norden. He was consul for Denmark from 1939. He was a member of the gentlemen's club SK Fram from 1939 to 1943. He died in January 1982.
