= Fredrik Stang =

Norwegian politician (1867–1941)

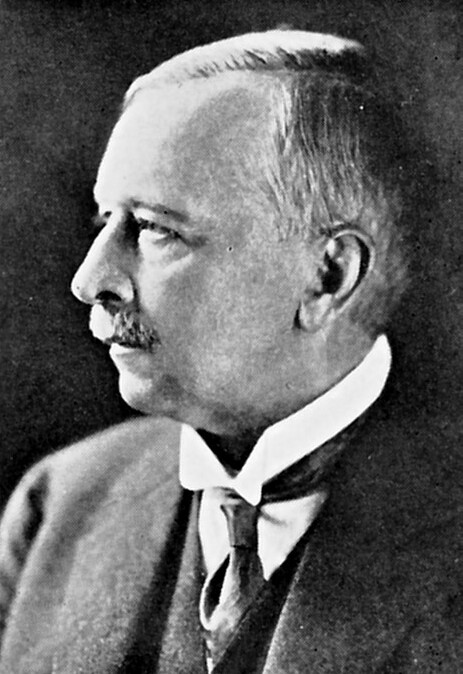

Minister of Justice
- In office 20 February 1912 – 31 January 1913
- Prime Minister: Jens Bratlie
- Preceded by: Herman Scheel
- Succeeded by: Lars Abrahamsen

Leader of the Conservative Party
- In office 1907–1911
- Preceded by: Edmund Harbitz
- Succeeded by: Jens Bratlie

Rector of the Royal Frederick University
- In office 1921–1927
- Preceded by: Axel Holst
- Succeeded by: Sem Sæland

Personal details
- Born: 27 December 1867 Kristiania, Sweden-Norway
- Died: 15 November 1941 (aged 73) Oslo, Reichskommissariat Norwegen
- Spouse(s): Augusta Wedel-Jarlsberg; Margrethe Grung Andvord; Caroline Schweigaard (1894–?)
- Children: Christian Schweigaard Stang

Fredrik Stang (27 December 1867 – 15 November 1941) was a Norwegian law professor and politician for the Conservative Party. He served as a Member of Parliament, leader of the Conservative Party, Minister of Justice and the Police, Chairman of the Norwegian Nobel Committee, and Rector of The Royal Frederick University. His father was Prime Minister Emil Stang and his grandfather was Prime Minister Frederik Stang.

== Career ==
He obtained the cand.jur. degree in 1890. In 1897, he was appointed Professor of Jurisprudence at The Royal Frederick University. He served as a Member of Parliament 1906–1909, and was leader of the Conservative Party 1907–1911. He served as the Norwegian Minister of Justice and the Police 1912–1913. In 1918, he obtained the dr.juris degree, and also received an honorary doctorate from the University of Copenhagen.

He was chairman of the Norwegian Nobel Committee, responsible for awarding the Nobel Peace Prize, 1922–1940. He was rector of The Royal Frederick University 1921–1927 (and ex officio Dean of the Faculty of Law) and editor of Tidsskrift for Retsvidenskab 1921–1936.

== Personal life ==
He was born in Kristiania as the son of Prime Minister Emil Stang and his wife Adelaide Pauline Berg. He was a brother of Emil Stang Jr. and grandson of former Prime Minister Frederik Stang. Further out in the family, he was a third cousin of Ole A. Stang, Jørgen Breder Stang and Olaf Stang.

In 1894 he married Caroline Schweigaard (1871–1900), daughter of another former Prime Minister Christian Homann Schweigaard and granddaughter of Anton Martin Schweigaard and Thorvald Meyer. They had only one child Christian Schweigaard Stang, who became a well-known linguist.

Academic offices
Preceded by Axel Holst	Rector of The Royal Frederick University (ex officio Dean of the Faculty of Law); 1921–1927	Succeeded by Sem Sæland
