= Mads Wiel Stang =

Norwegian politician {1838–1909)

Mads Wiel Stang (19 September 1838 – 23 August 1909) was a Norwegian forest owner and politician for the Conservative Party.

== Personal life ==
He was born in Frederikshald as a son of sawmill owner Ole Andreas Stang (1807–1883) and Anne Bolette f. Wiel. His own son Ole Andreas Stang (1872–1956) was a landowner, and through him, Mads Wiel Stang was a grandfather of Thomas Stang and Axel Heiberg Stang.

== Career ==
After finishing his secondary education in 1857, Mads Wiel Stang spent the following years in Germany, France and Scotland. He learnt commerce and studied forestry in Giessen. In 1863 he entered the timber business, first as an employee of his first cousin Thomas Stang and later in the company Mørch, Stang & Co, partnering with Severin Mørch and later Johan Thorne. In 1873 he established the company Stang & Brecke, with Mads Wiel Stang later becoming the sole proprietor in 1898. His company was named Mads W. Stang from 1903, and his three sons became co-owners in 1904.

Stang was an elected member of Fredrikstad city council for 23 years, serving two years as deputy mayor and two years as mayor. He reportedly refused to be nominated as a candidate for the Parliament of Norway, but was nonetheless elected as a deputy representative in 1888. He was vice consul for Germany from 1879 to 1898, and was a supervisory council member of the Norwegian Forestry Society.

He died in August 1909 in Kristiania.

Political offices
Preceded by Waldemar Ebbesen	Mayor of Fredrikstad; 1880	Succeeded by Martin Larssen
Preceded by Martin Larssen	Mayor of Fredrikstad; 1882	Succeeded by Ove E. Ramm
