= Emil Stang (jurist) =

Norwegian jurist and politician (1882–1964)

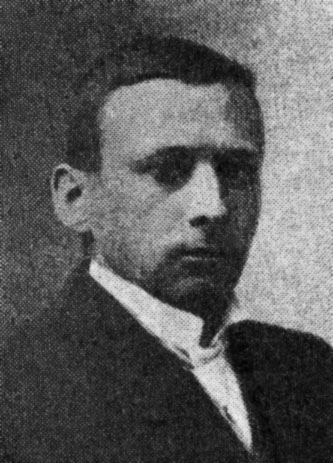

Chief Justice of the Supreme Court of Norway
- In office 1946–1952
- Preceded by: Paal Berg
- Succeeded by: Sverre Grette

Member of Oslo City Council
- In office 1917–1928

Leader of the Norwegian Labour Party
- In office 1922–1923
- Preceded by: Kyrre Grepp
- Succeeded by: Oscar Torp

Personal details
- Born: 22 September 1882 Kristiania, Norway
- Died: 21 December 1964 (aged 82)
- Party: Communist Party of Norway (1923–1928); Norwegian Labour Party (1911–1923)
- Parent(s): Emil Stang; Adelaide Pauline Berg
- Relatives: Fredrik Stang (brother); Frederik Stang (grandfather); Christian Schweigaard Stang (nephew); Axel Heiberg Stang (cousin)
- Occupation: Jurist and politician

Emil Stang Jr. (22 September 1882 – 21 December 1964) was a Norwegian jurist and politician for the Norwegian Labour Party and for the Communist Party of Norway. He was later the 13th Chief Justice of the Supreme Court of Norway.

Stang finished his secondary education in 1900, and graduated as cand.jur. in 1905. He practised as a barrister in Kristiania from 1911. He joined the Norwegian Labour Party in 1911, and was elected vice chairman from 1918. He was a delegate to the Founding Congress of Comintern in Moscow in 1919. After the death of Kyrre Grepp he was acting leader of the Norwegian Labour Party, from 1922 to 1923. He participated in the formation of the Communist Party of Norway in 1923, where he became a member of the Central Committee. He left the Communist Party in 1928. He was a member of the Kristiania City Council from 1917 to 1928. He was a substitute to the Parliament of Norway from 1922 to 1924. He was also a member of a number of committees on law reforms. From 1928 Stang concentrated on his juridical career. He was appointed Supreme Court judge from 1937. During the occupation of Norway by Nazi Germany he was arrested and held at the prison Møllergata 19 in Oslo and at the Sachsenhausen concentration camp in Germany. He was Chief Justice of the Supreme Court of Norway from 1946 to 1952.

During the legal purge in Norway after World War II, Stang was one of the minority of judges to vote to execute his cousin, Axel Heiberg Stang, for treason, after he was convicted of collaborationism.

== Personal life ==
Stang was born in Kristiania as the son of Prime Minister and chairman of the Conservative Party, Emil Stang, and his wife Adelaide Pauline Berg. He was married to Fredrikke Elise Nicoline Bøckman Otto from 1907 to 1920, and to Sigrid Friis from 1925. He was a grandson of Prime Minister Frederik Stang, brother of politician Fredrik Stang and uncle of Christian Schweigaard Stang. Further out in the family, he was a third cousin of Ole A. Stang, Jørgen Breder Stang and Olaf Stang.

Legal offices
Preceded by Paal Berg	Chief Justice of the Supreme Court of Norway; 1946–1952	Succeeded by Sverre Grette
