= Fabian Stang =

Norwegian lawyer and politician

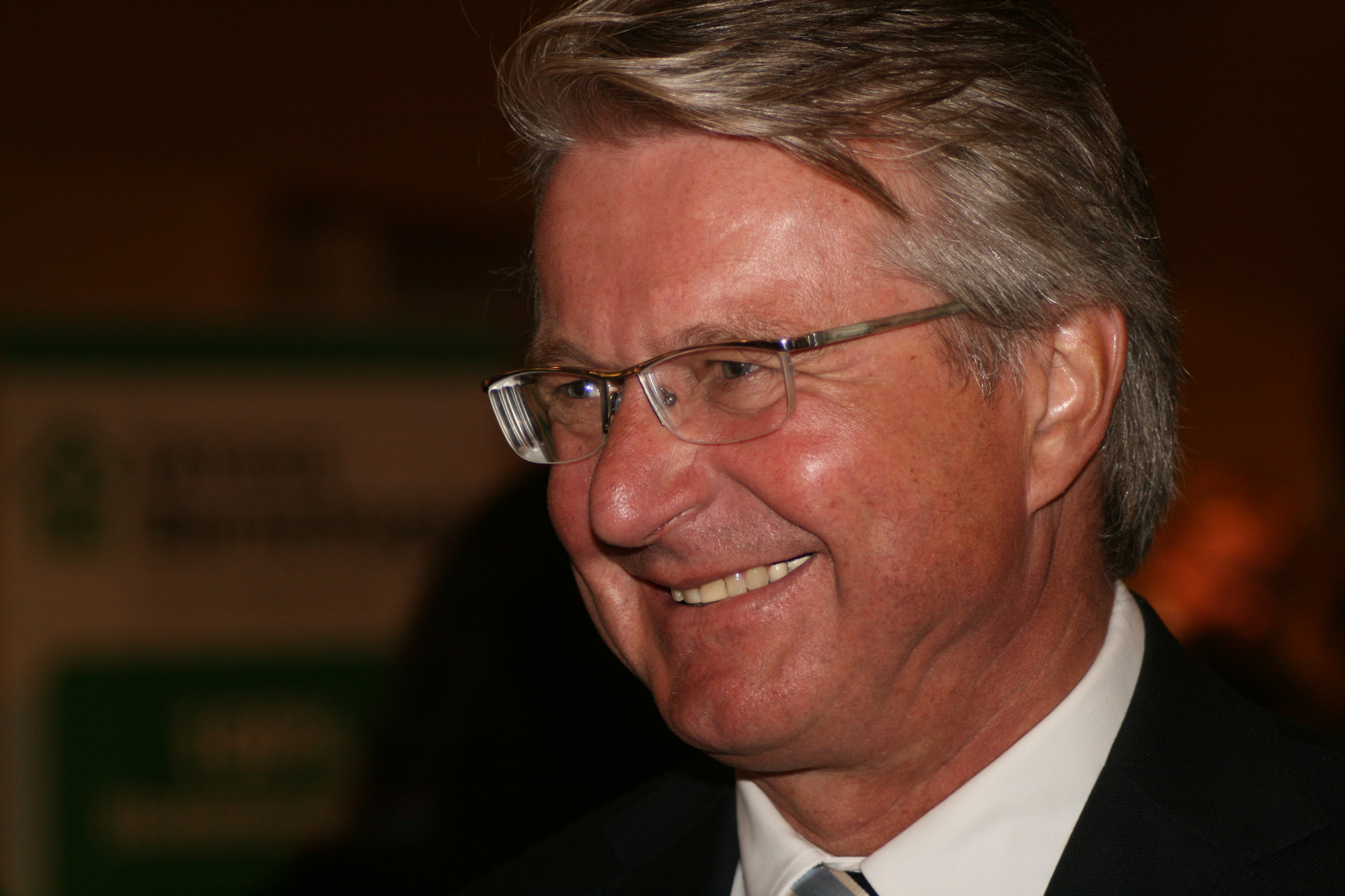

66th Mayor of Oslo
- In office 17 October 2007 – 21 October 2015
- Deputy: Aud Kvalbein; Libe Rieber-Mohn
- Governing Mayor: Erling Lae; Stian Berger Røsland
- Preceded by: Svenn Kristiansen
- Succeeded by: Marianne Borgen

Personal details
- Born: 19 August 1955 (age 70) Oslo, Norway
- Political party: Conservative

Richard Fabian Stang (born 19 August 1955) is a Norwegian lawyer and a politician for the Conservative Party. He was Mayor of the city of Oslo from 2007 until 2015.

== Early life and education ==
Stang was born in Oslo. He is the son of Norwegian actress Wenche Foss and entrepreneur Thomas Stang.

== Career ==
Stang was first elected Mayor of Oslo in 2007, and reelected in 2011.

In 2012 Stang spoke out in favour of increased immigration.

Stang is a supporter of subsidies and perks for electric cars in the city.

In 2015 Stang lost the mayoral election to Socialist Marianne Borgen.

Political offices
Preceded by Svenn Kristiansen	Mayor of Oslo; 2007–2015	Succeeded by Marianne Borgen
