= Mo Industrial Park =

Industrial park in Norway

Coordinates: 66°18′33″N 14°10′07″E

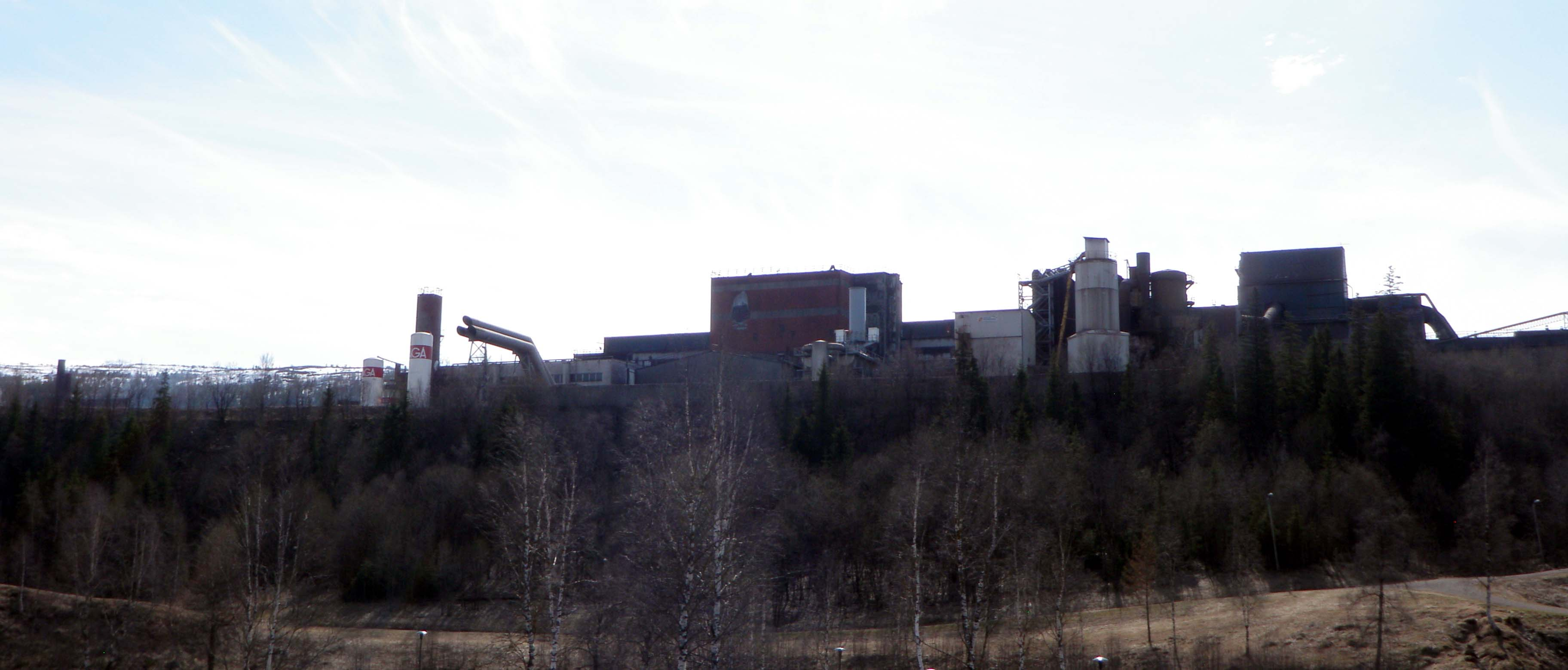
Mo Industrial Park

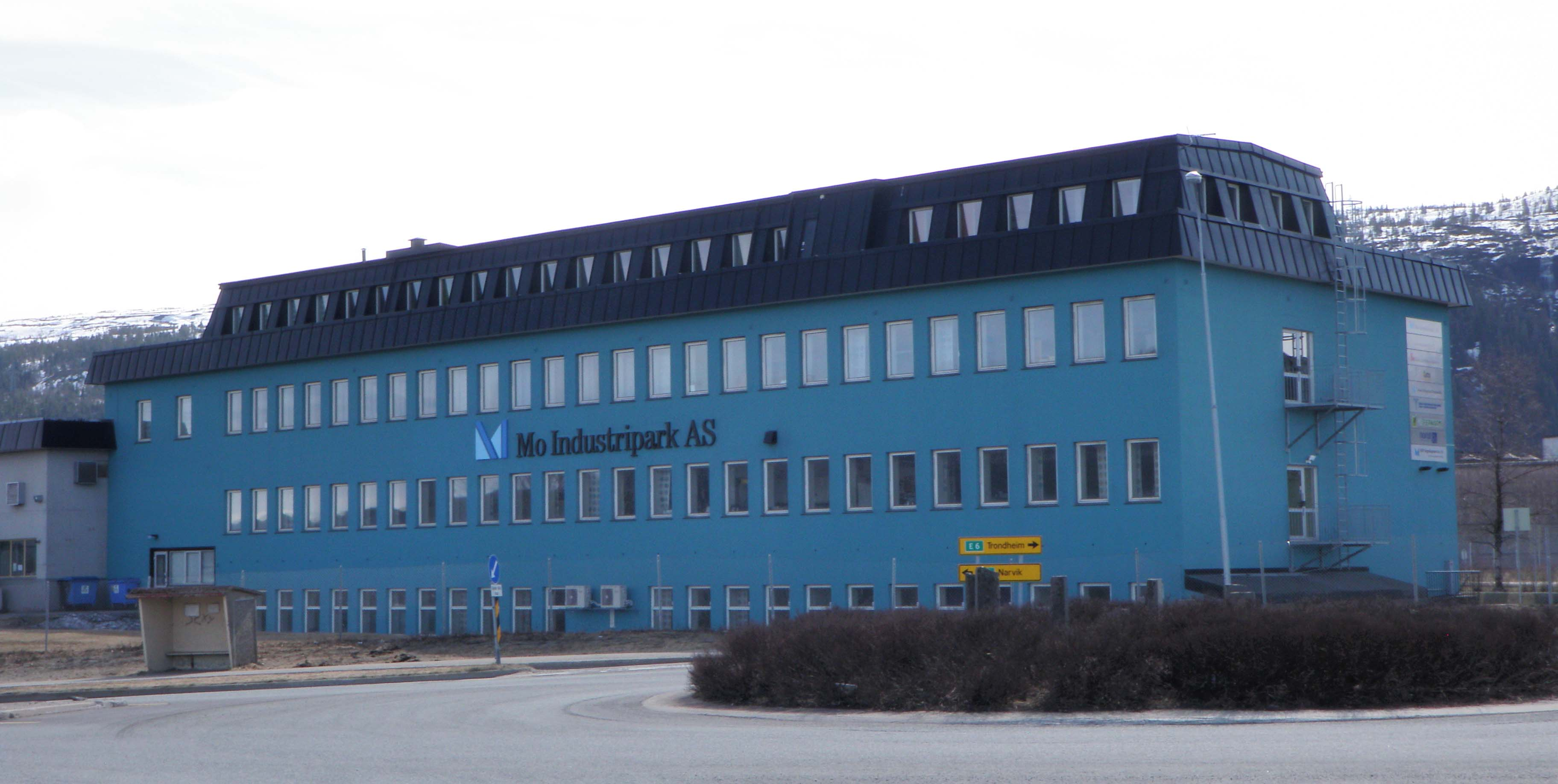
Building at Mo Industrial Park

Mo Industrial Park (Norwegian: Mo Industripark) is one of Norway's largest industrial parks, situated in the town of Mo i Rana, North Norway. The company Mo Industrial Park produces oxygen, nitrogen and compressed air, and also provides security, telephone-switchboard and mail services to the other companies in the park. The companies engage in a wide range of activities, including iron and steel production, ferroalloy production, workshop industry, service industry, research, quality and computer technology, expertise industry, and even fish farming. Total gross income is close to 4 billion NOK per year.

The industrial park is located where the company Norsk Jernverk has its production facilities. In 1946, after World War II, the Parliament of Norway saw a need for steel production in Norway, while also wanting to strengthen the development of North Norway by encouraging industrial activity in the region, providing employment to thousands of people. This led to the decision to build an iron mill in Mo i Rana. Norwegian Iron Work was producing steel for the country from 1947 until 1988, when the company was divided into several new companies. The iron mill had a significant impact on the town development of Mo i Rana. In 1955, the city's population had grown from 2,000 to 20,000. In 2007, the park housed 130 companies. It is still important for the local society, giving work to approximately 2,000 people.

== Companies ==
This is an incomplete list of the companies present in the park.

- Ruukki Profiler AS, (Rautaruukki) (produces reinforcement steel products, based on melted trash iron. It is Norway's largest recovery plant. The company has its own rolling mill.
- Rio Doce Manganese Norway (produces Manganese alloys, Carbon monoxide, Steel Profiles)
- Molab AS (industrial laboratory)
- Fesil Rana Metall AS (produces ferrosilicon)
- NRK (licence division)
- Rana Industriterminal AS. (one of Norway's busiest harbours)
- Mo Fjernvarme AS. (distributes heated water to the city, with a yearly production of 70 GWh)
