= A.M. Anderssen Mekaniske Verksted =

Former Norwegian boiler and HVAC manufacturer

- Formerly: AMA Parca
- Company type: Aksjeselskap
- Industry: Boilers, HVAC equipment
- Founded: 1921
- Defunct: 1980s
- Fate: Production part sold to Parca Norrahammar; closed
- Headquarters: Furuset, Oslo, Norway
- Key people: A.M. Anderssen
- Products: Central-heating boilers, high-pressure boilers, HVAC equipment

A.M. Anderssen Mekaniske Verksted was a large producer of central-heating boilers, high-pressure boilers, and other HVAC equipment under the AMA brand. The company was established in Groruddalen in 1921, and a factory at Furuset was built in the early 1950s. It had 85 employees in 1957 and was closed in the mid-1980s.

The factory at Furuset was in many ways typical of Oslo industry in the 1960s and 1970s, when Oslo was at its largest as an industrial city, both in the number of companies and the number of industrial workers. More than the industrial flagships such as Aker and Christiania Spigerverk, it was the many small and medium-sized companies producing for special markets or acting as subcontractors to larger industries that made up the main bulk of Oslo industry.

== History ==
The firm was founded by A.M. Anderssen in 1921 and was a mechanical and welding workshop that produced central-heating and high-pressure boilers.

In the 1960s the company aimed at the export market with its hot-water tanks and boilers, with help from the Norwegian export council. England and the Nordic countries had opened up, and the company was also to try Western Germany. The manager at the time, Jan M. Anderssen, interviewed in Aftenposten, held that the firm competed well on quality but had much to gain in productivity and production costs, which it tried to improve through time studies with accompanying systematization, rationalization, and simplification of production.

In 1980 the future still looked bright for AMA, with large orders for public buildings among other things. In 1982 the firm was split into a production part and a property part, and not long after the production part was sold to the Swedish Parca Norrahammar. The operations director at the time held that this secured the 70 jobs and opened the door to large exports, but it did not turn out that way: the Swedes' new subsidiary AMA Parca quickly became a pure sales company for the Swedish products, and production at Furuset was closed.
