= Andfiskvatnet =

Lake in Rana, Norway

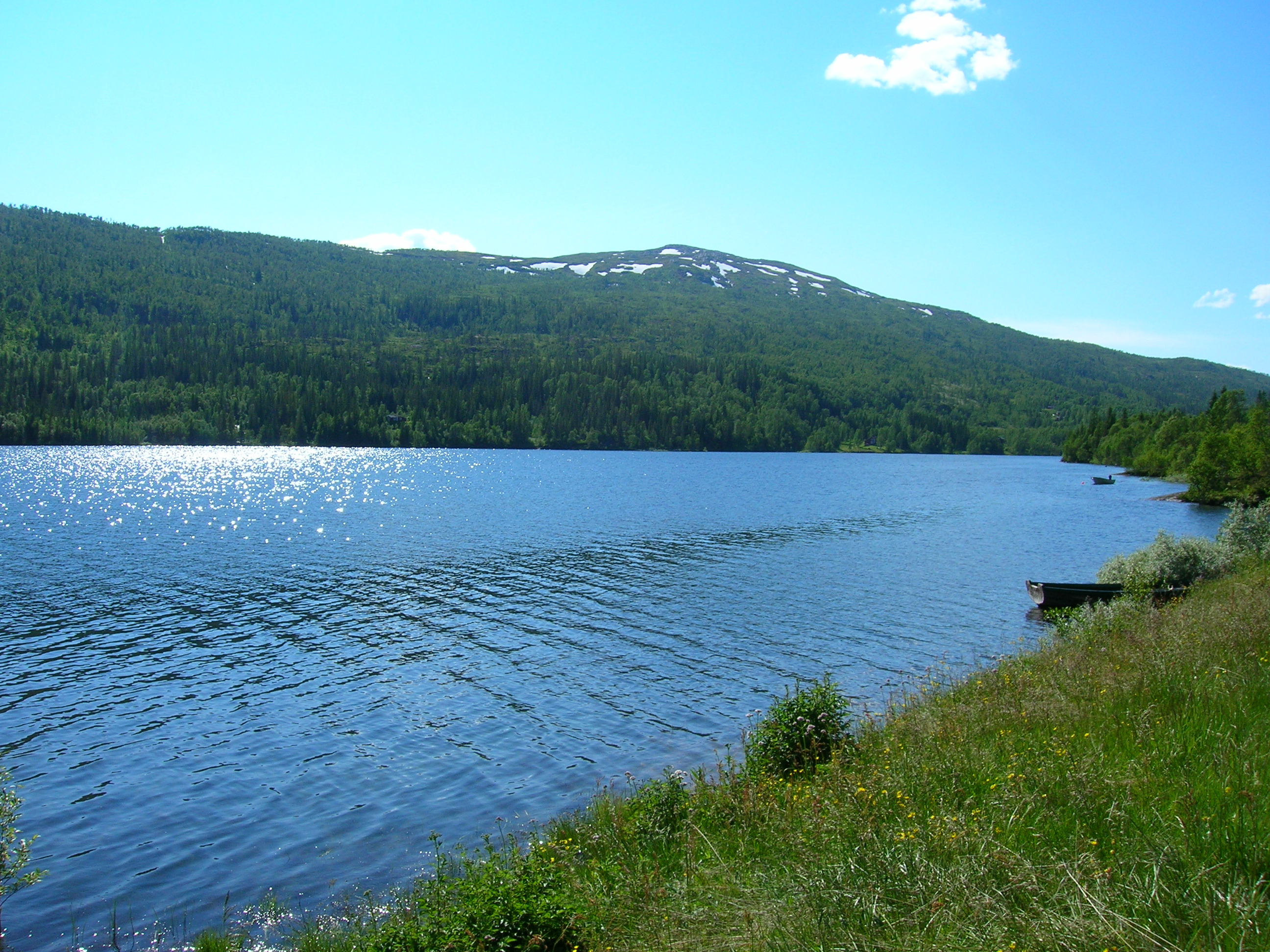
- Interactive map of Andfiskvatnet
- Location: Rana Municipality, Nordland
- Coordinates: 66.2721°N 14.1303°E
- Primary outflows: Andfiskåga
- Basin countries: Norway
- Max. length: 6 kilometres (3.7 mi)
- Max. width: 0.8 kilometres (0.50 mi)
- Surface area: 2.7 km^{2} (1.0 sq mi)
- Shore length^{1}: 17.24 kilometres (10.71 mi)
- Surface elevation: 241 metres (791 ft)
- References: NVE
- ^{1} Shore length is not a well-defined measure.

Andfiskvatnet is a lake in Rana Municipality in Nordland county, Norway. The 2.7-square-kilometre (1.0 sq mi) lake lies about 3 kilometres (1.9 mi) southeast of the village of Hauknes and about 6 kilometres (3.7 mi) south of the town of Mo i Rana. The lake flows out into the river Andfiskåga which flows into the Ranfjorden.

== See also ==
- List of lakes in Norway
