= Båsmoen =

Village in Rana Municipality, Norway

- Neighborhood in Mo i Rana
- Interactive map of Båsmoen
- Location within Nordland Location within Norway
- Coordinates: 66.3354°N 14.1018°E
- Country: Norway
- Region: Northern Norway
- County: Nordland
- District: Helgeland
- Municipality: Rana Municipality
- Elevation: 50 m (160 ft)
- Time zone: UTC+01:00 (CET)
  - Summer (DST): UTC+02:00 (CEST)
- Post Code: 8616 Mo i Rana

Båsmoen is a neighborhood in the northwestern part of the town of Mo i Rana, located in Rana Municipality in Nordland county, Norway. It is located about 7 kilometres (4.3 mi) northwest of the centre of Mo i Rana. Båsmoen is located to the west of the neighborhood of Ytteren, both area are located across the Ranfjorden from the town centre.
