= Ytteren Church =

Church in Nordland, Norway

- Ytteren kirke
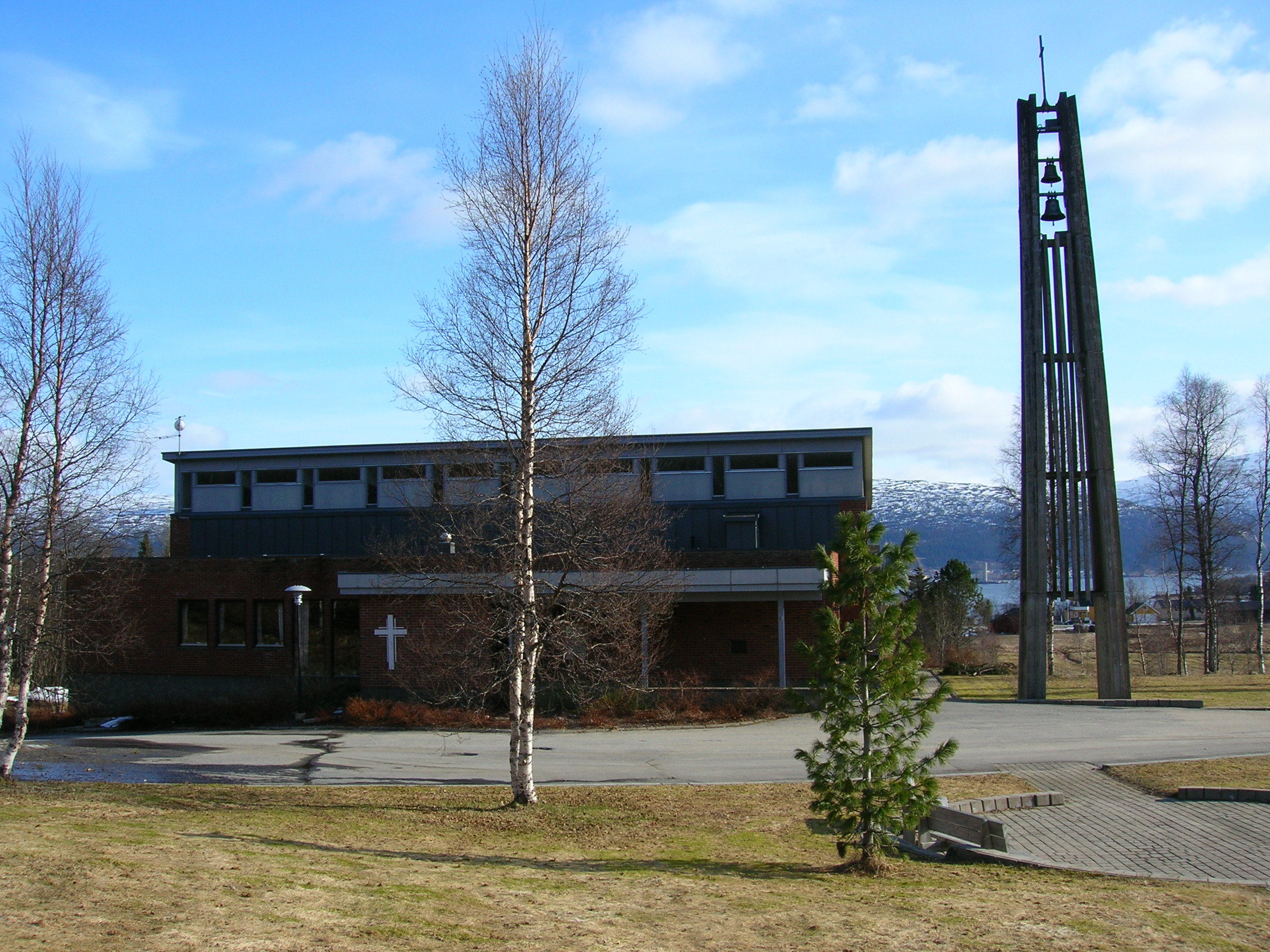
- View of the church
- Ytteren Church
- 66.3452707°N 14.1280854°E
- Location: Rana Municipality, Nordland
- Country: Norway
- Denomination: Church of Norway
- Churchmanship: Evangelical Lutheran

History
- Status: Parish church
- Founded: 1977
- Consecrated: 4 Sept 1977

Architecture
- Functional status: Active
- Architect: Nils Toft
- Architectural type: Rectangular
- Completed: 1977 (49 years ago)

Specifications
- Capacity: 500
- Materials: Brick

Administration
- Diocese: Sør-Hålogaland
- Deanery: Indre Helgeland prosti
- Parish: Nord-Rana

Ytteren Church (Norwegian: Ytteren kirke) is a parish church of the Church of Norway in Rana Municipality in Nordland county, Norway. It is located in the village of Ytteren, a northern suburb of the town of Mo i Rana. It is the main church for the Nord-Rana parish which is part of the Indre Helgeland prosti (deanery) in the Diocese of Sør-Hålogaland. The brick church was built in a rectangular style in 1977 using plans drawn up by the architect Nils Toft. The church seats about 500 people. The church was consecrated on 4 September 1977 by Bishop Bjarne Odd Weider.

== Media gallery ==
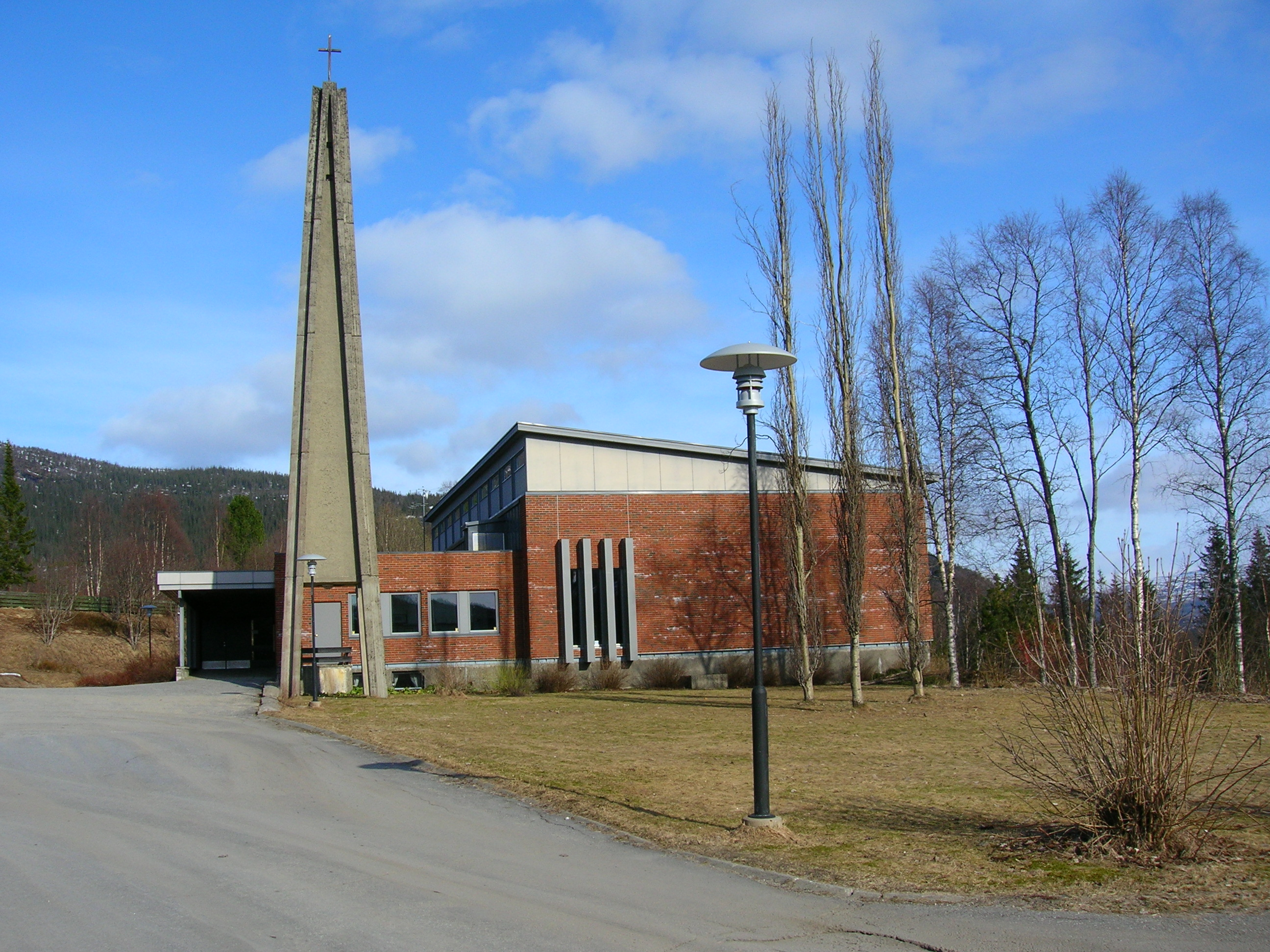

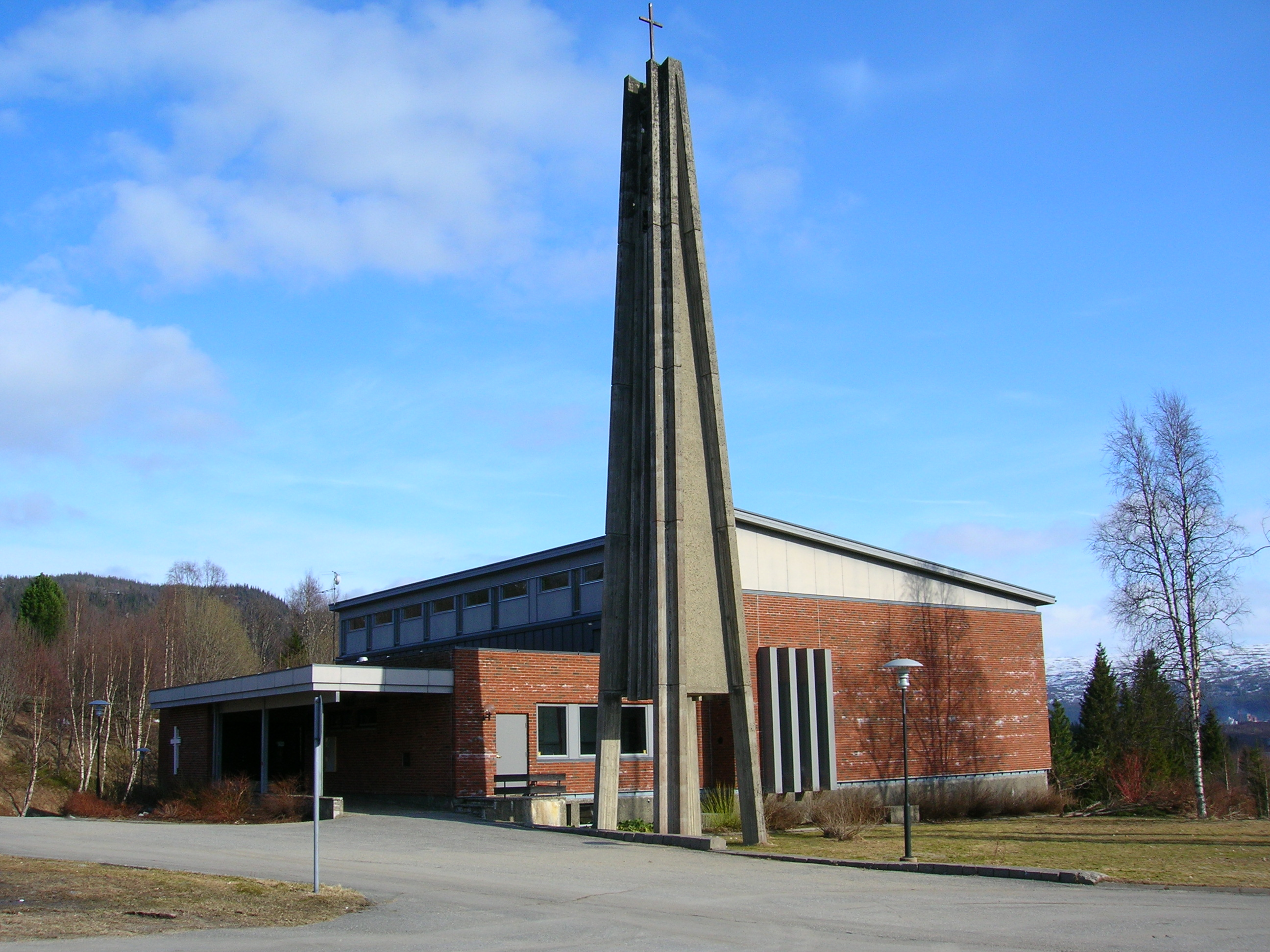

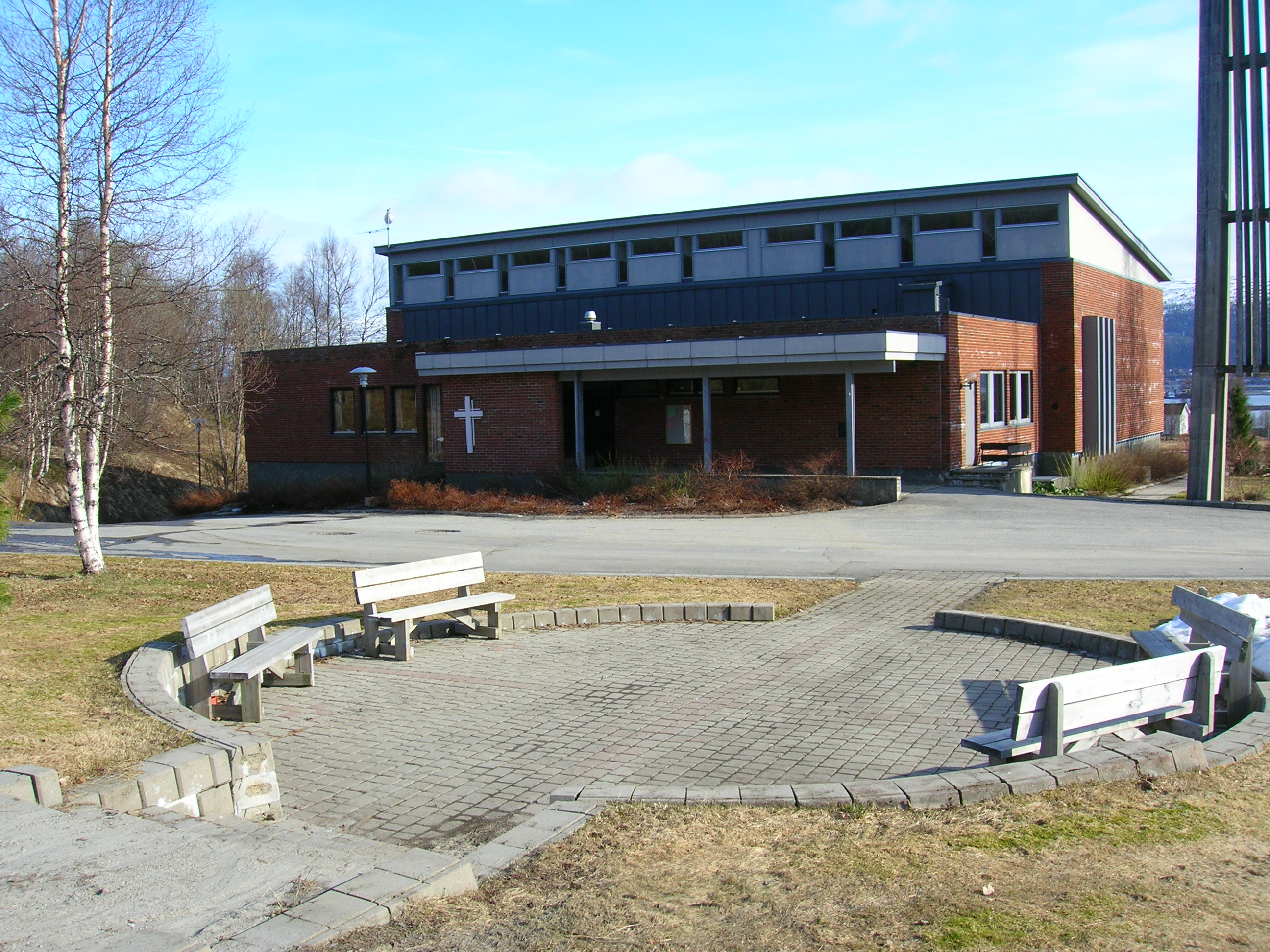

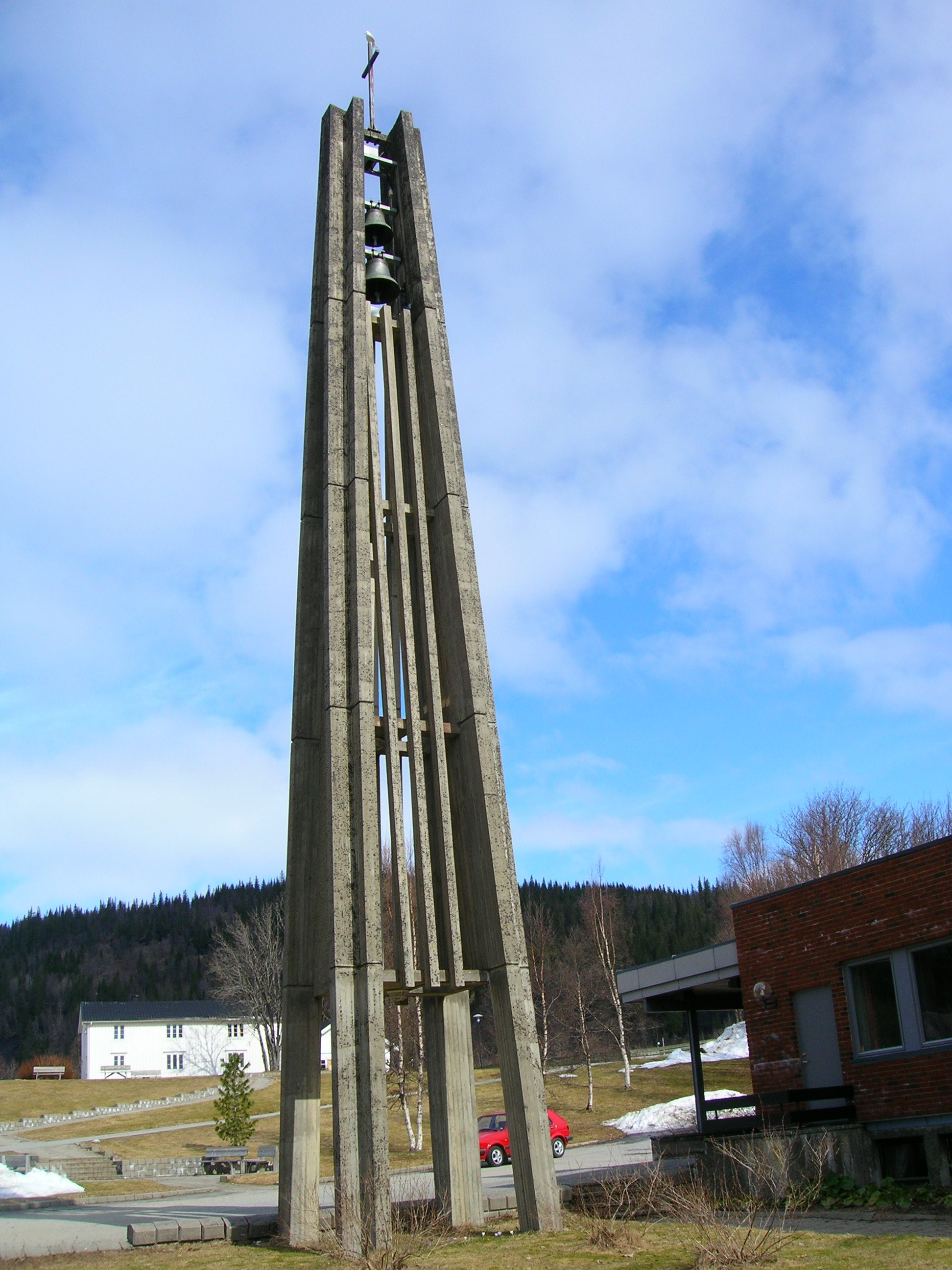

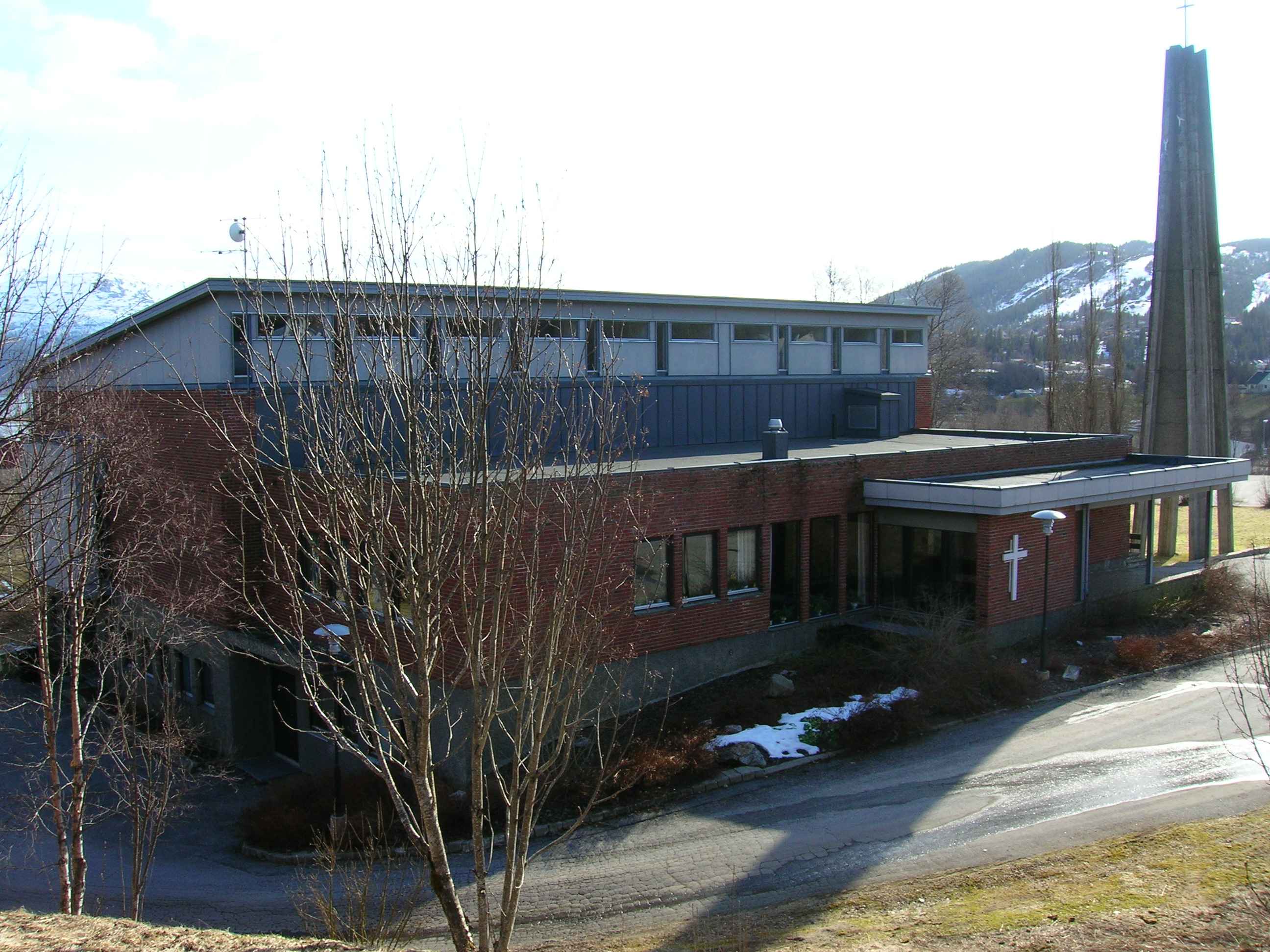

== See also ==
- List of churches in Sør-Hålogaland
