= Ytteren =

Village in Rana Municipality, Norway

- Neighborhood in Mo i Rana
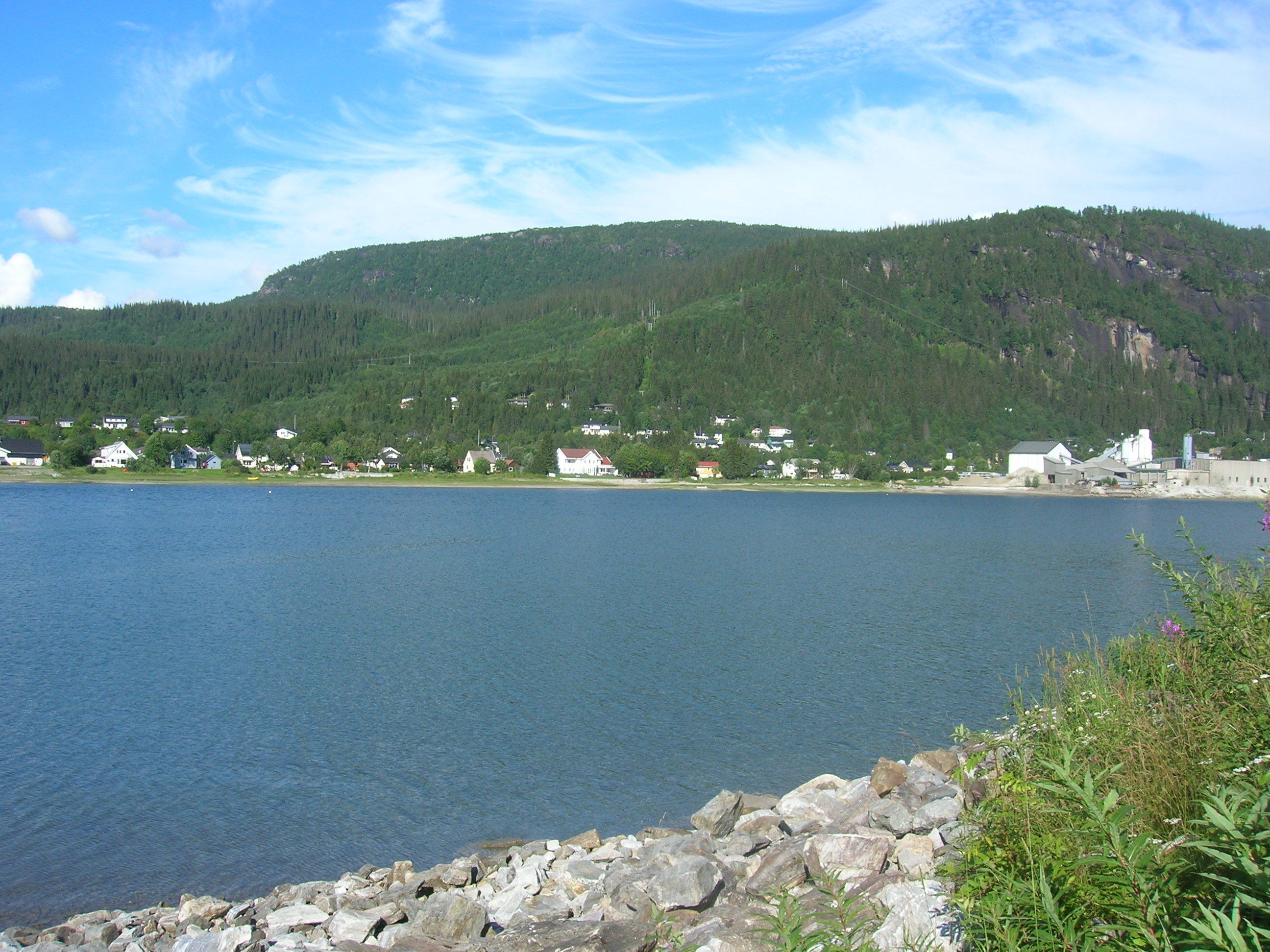
- View of the neighborhood
- Interactive map of Ytteren
- Location within Nordland Location within Norway
- Coordinates: 66.34138°N 14.13911°E
- Country: Norway
- Region: Northern Norway
- County: Nordland
- District: Helgeland
- Municipality: Rana Municipality
- Elevation: 10 m (33 ft)
- Time zone: UTC+01:00 (CET)
  - Summer (DST): UTC+02:00 (CEST)
- Post Code: 8614 Mo i Rana

Ytteren is a neighborhood in the town of Mo i Rana, in Rana Municipality, Nordland county, Norway. Together with the neighboring village of Båsmoen, Ytteren forms the northern part of Mo i Rana.Mo i Rana. They are both located on the northern edge of the mouth of the Ranelva river at the Ranfjorden. Norwegian County Road 12 runs through the village. The large lake Langvatnet lies about 2 kilometres (1.2 mi) north of the village.

The village was the administrative centre of the old Nord-Rana Municipality which existed from 1839 until 1964. Ytteren Church is located in the village. The local sports club is Bossmo & Ytteren IL.
