= Hauknes =

Village in Rana Municipality, Norway

- Village
- Interactive map of Hauknes
- Location within Nordland Location within Norway
- Coordinates: 66.2867°N 14.0580°E
- Country: Norway
- Region: Northern Norway
- County: Nordland
- District: Helgeland
- Municipality: Rana Municipality

Area
  - Total: 1.23 km^{2} (0.47 sq mi)
- Elevation: 60 m (200 ft)

Population (2023)
  - Total: 2,110
  - Density: 1,646/km^{2} (4,260/sq mi)
- Time zone: UTC+01:00 (CET)
  - Summer (DST): UTC+02:00 (CEST)
- Post Code: 8618 Mo i Rana

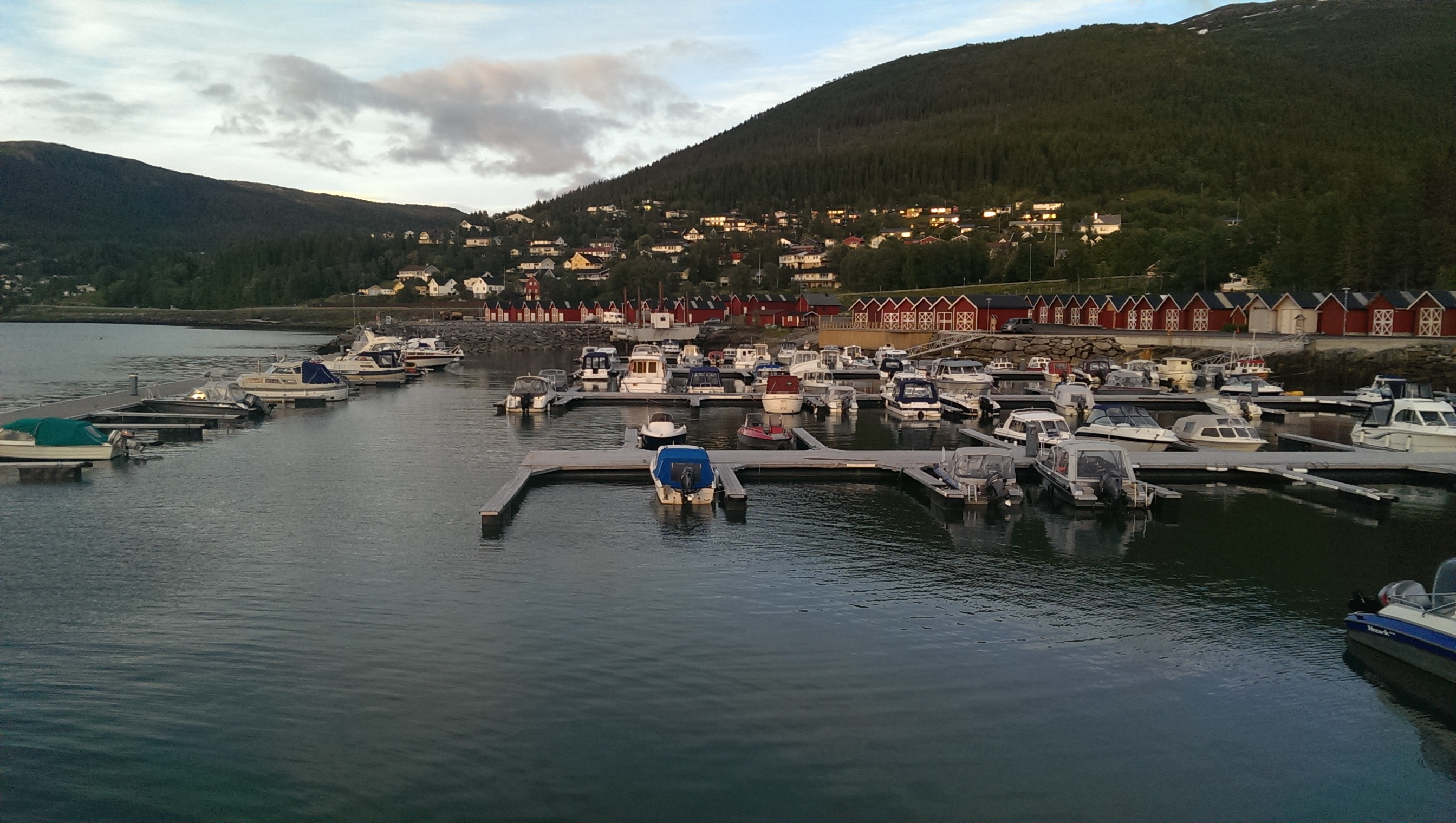
Hauknes-stranda

Hauknes is a village in Rana Municipality in Nordland county, Norway. It is a suburb of the town of Mo i Rana, which is located just a few kilometers to the northeast. The village is located on the south side of the Ranfjorden. The lake Andfiskvatnet lies about 3 kilometres (1.9 mi) southeast of the village.

The 1.23-square-kilometre (300-acre) village has a population (2023) of 2,110 and a population density of 1,646 inhabitants per square kilometre (4,260/sq mi).
