= Mo Church (Nordland) =

Church in Nordland, Norway

- Mo kirke
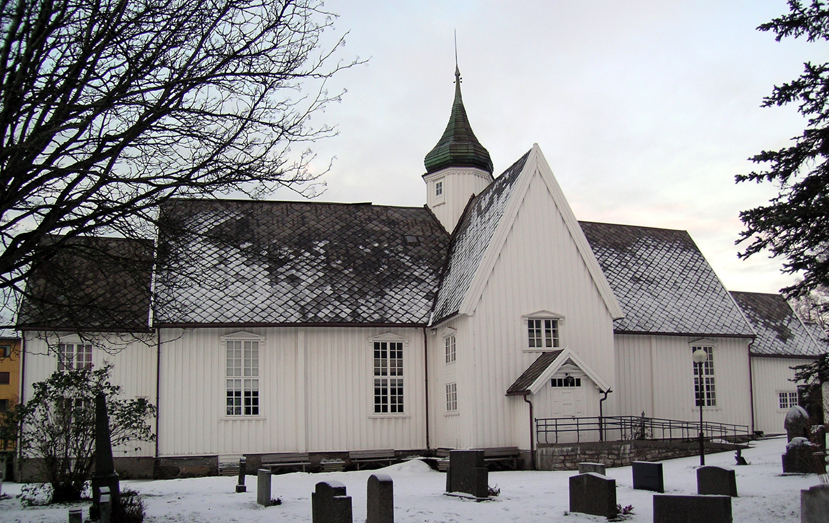
- View of the church
- Mo Church
- 66.3099338°N 14.1443363°E
- Location: Rana Municipality, Nordland
- Country: Norway
- Denomination: Church of Norway
- Churchmanship: Evangelical Lutheran

History
- Status: Parish church
- Founded: 1724
- Consecrated: 1724

Architecture
- Functional status: Active
- Architectural type: Cruciform
- Style: Neo-Gothic
- Completed: 1724 (302 years ago)

Specifications
- Capacity: 400
- Materials: Wood

Administration
- Diocese: Sør-Hålogaland
- Deanery: Indre Helgeland prosti
- Parish: Mo
- Norwegian Cultural Heritage Site
- Type: Church
- Status: Listed
- ID: 84962

Mo Church (Norwegian: Mo kirke) is a parish church of the Church of Norway in Rana Municipality in Nordland county, Norway. It is located in the town of Mo i Rana. It is the church for the Mo parish which is part of the Indre Helgeland prosti (deanery) in the Diocese of Sør-Hålogaland. The white, cruciform, wooden church was built in a neo-Gothic style in 1724. The church seats about 400 people.

== History ==
The church in Mo i Rana was founded in 1723-1724 when missionary Thomas von Westen led the construction of the new church. The first worship service held in the new church was on 6 January 1724. In 1832 the church underwent a renovation and expansion of the building. It included building a higher and steeper roof with a small onion dome tower on top. In 1860, the interior was redesigned. The church also underwent renovations in 1956 and again in 2007.

== Media gallery ==
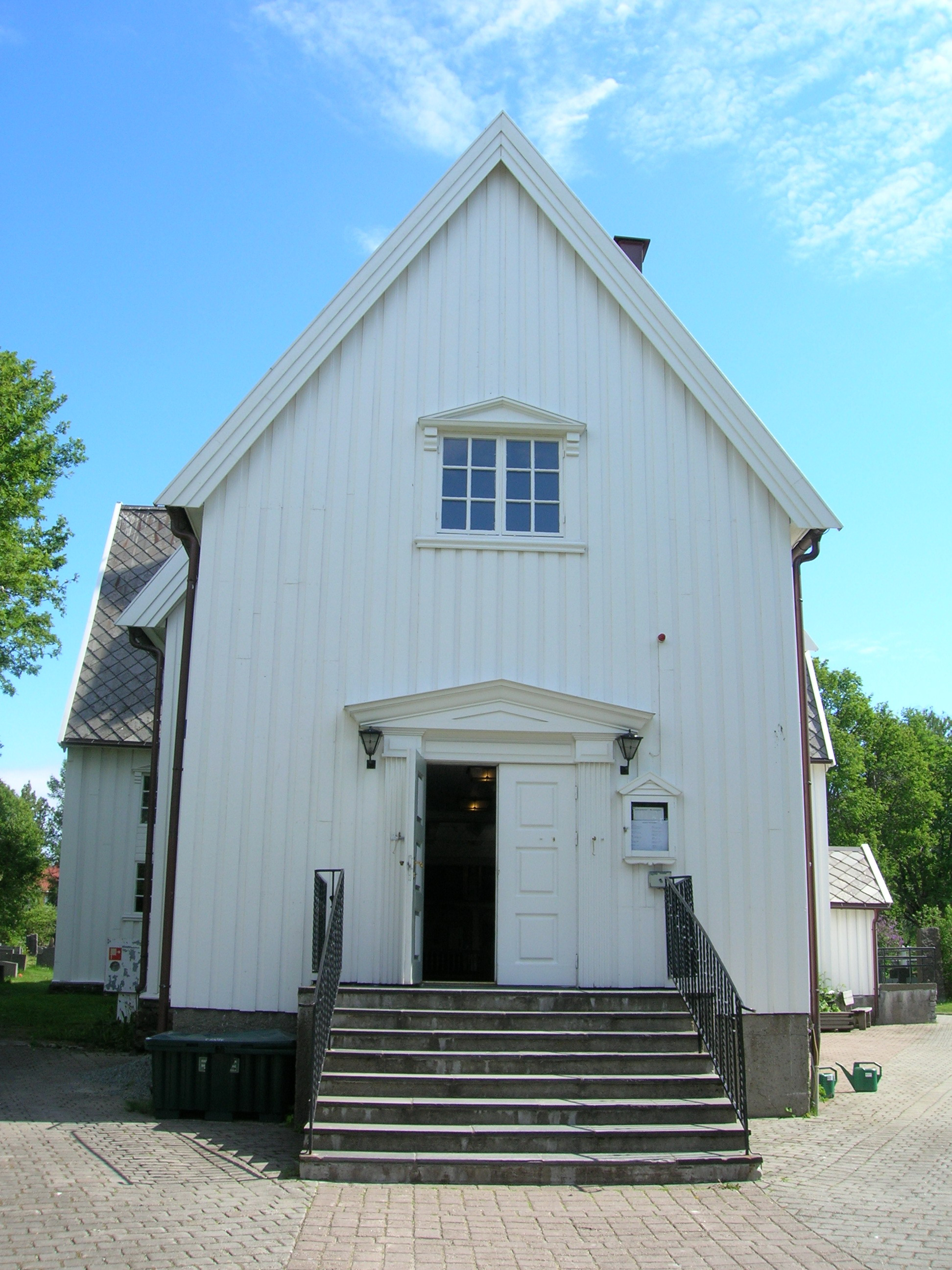

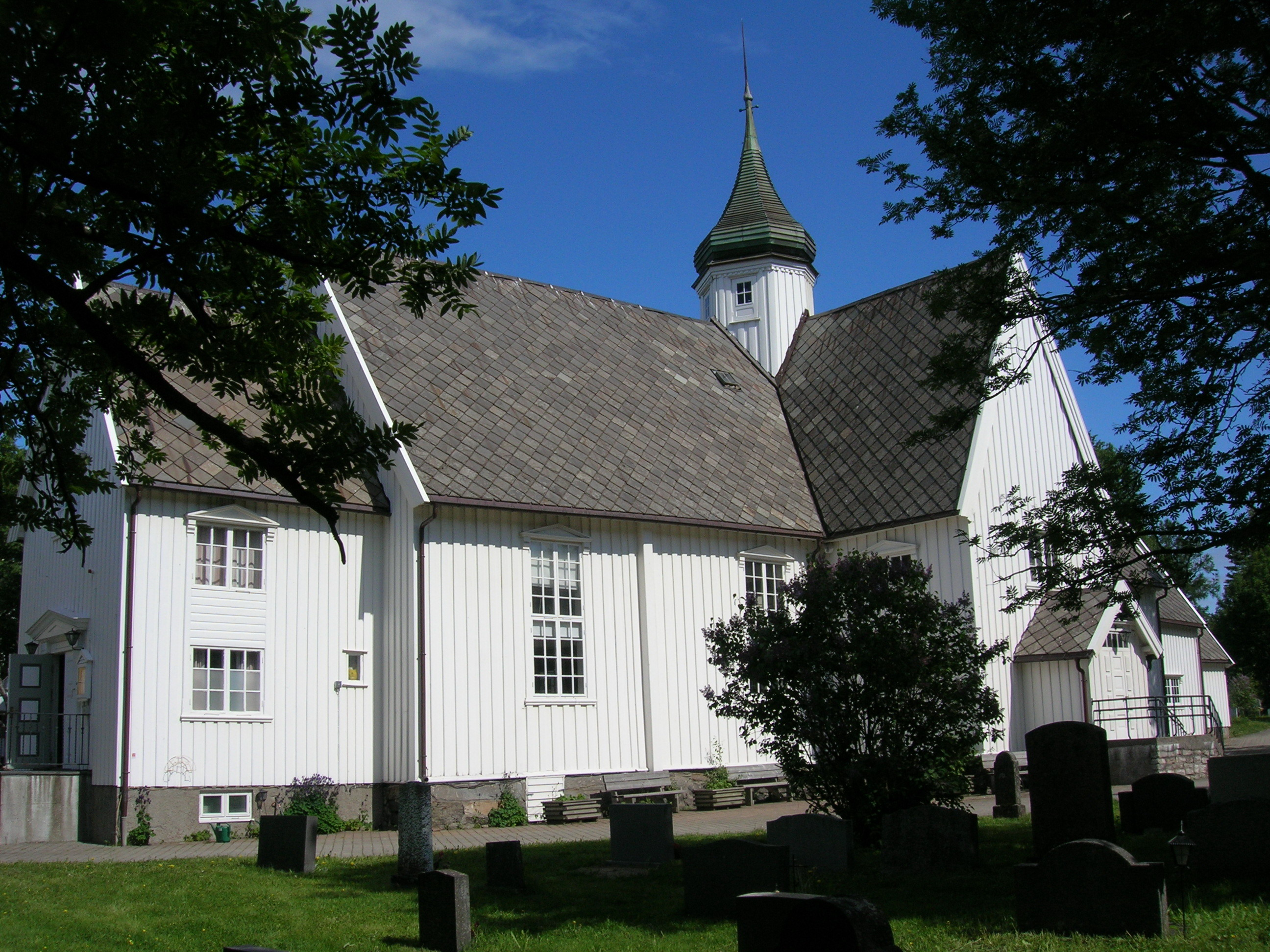

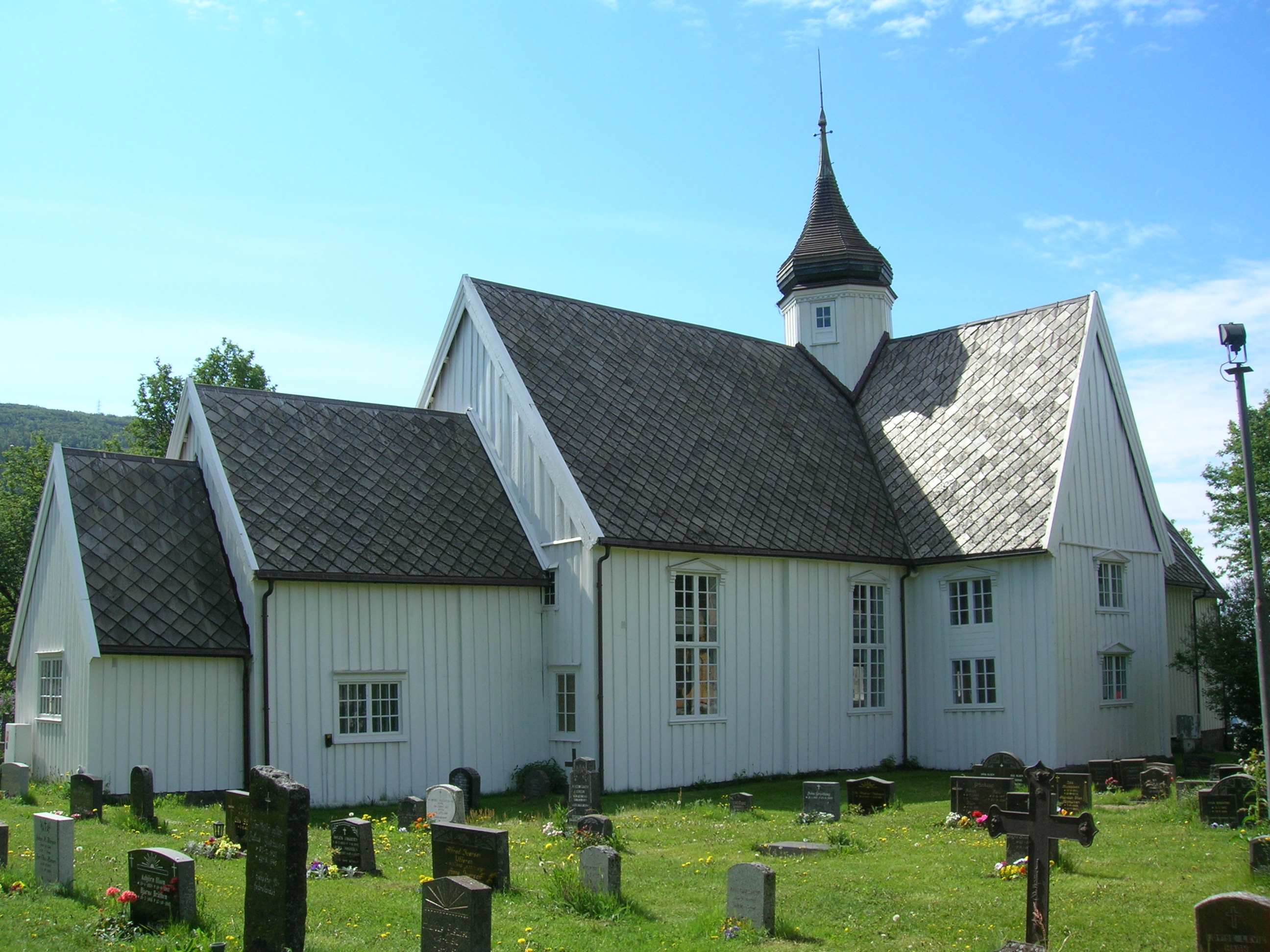

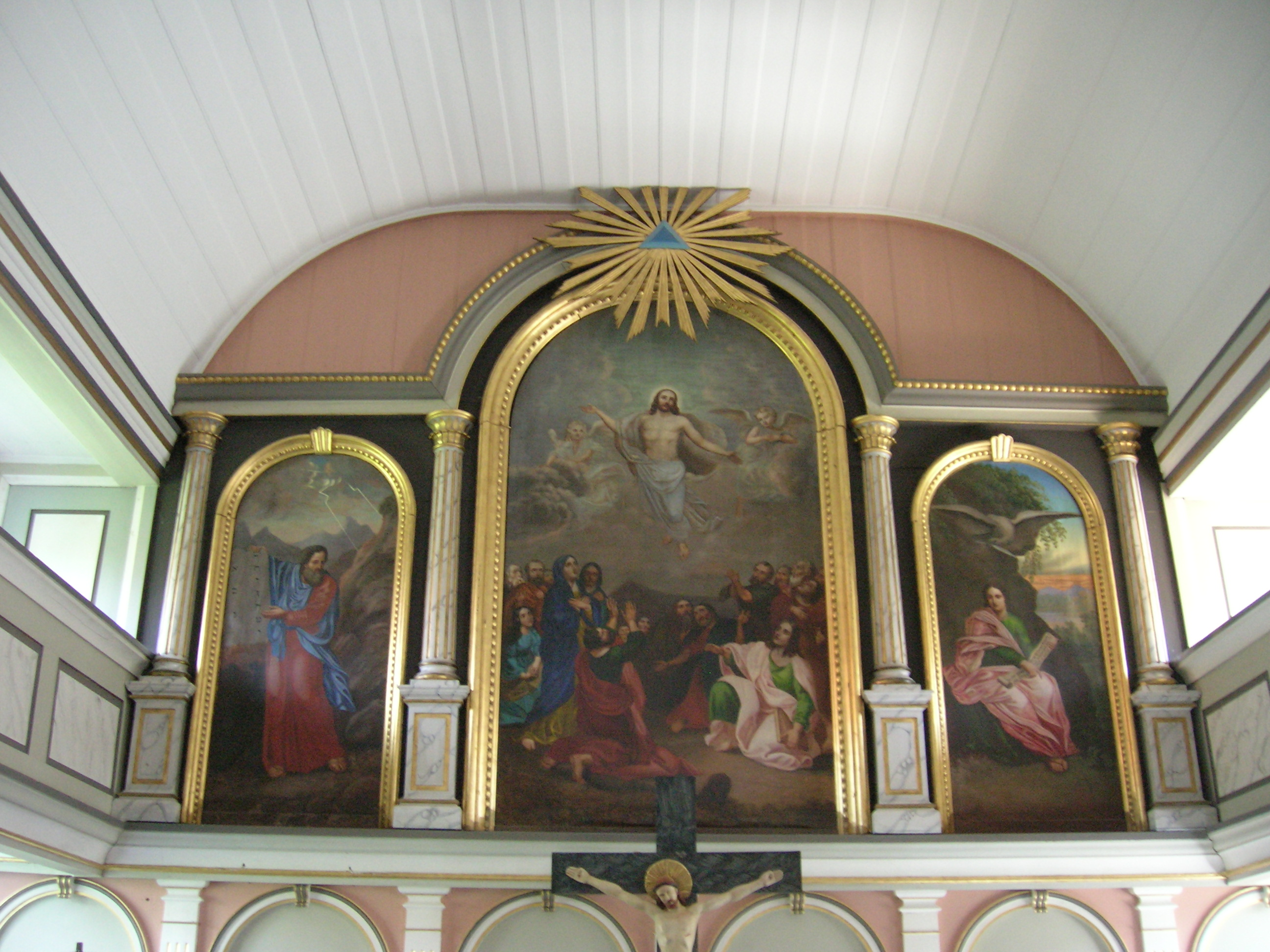

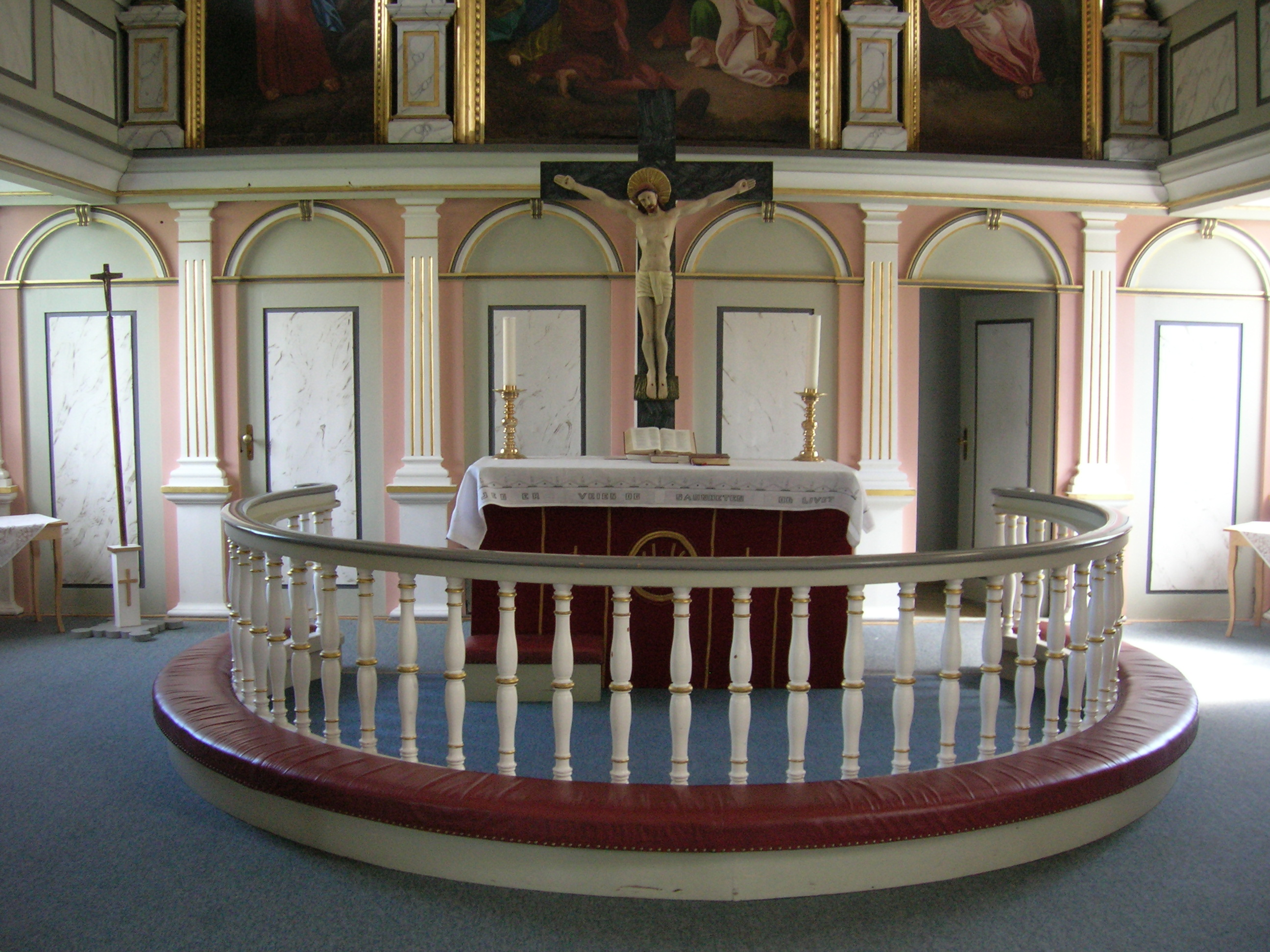

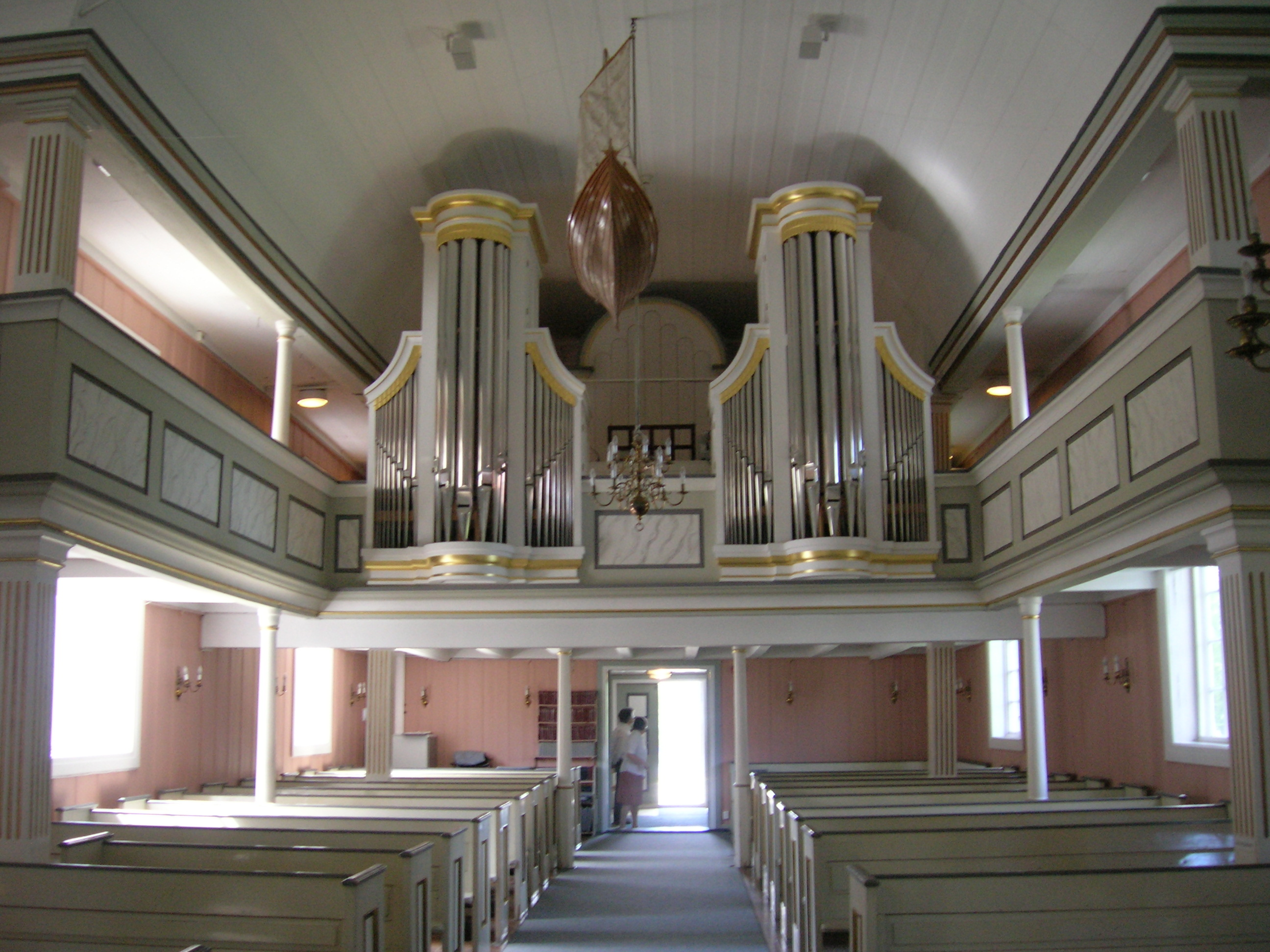

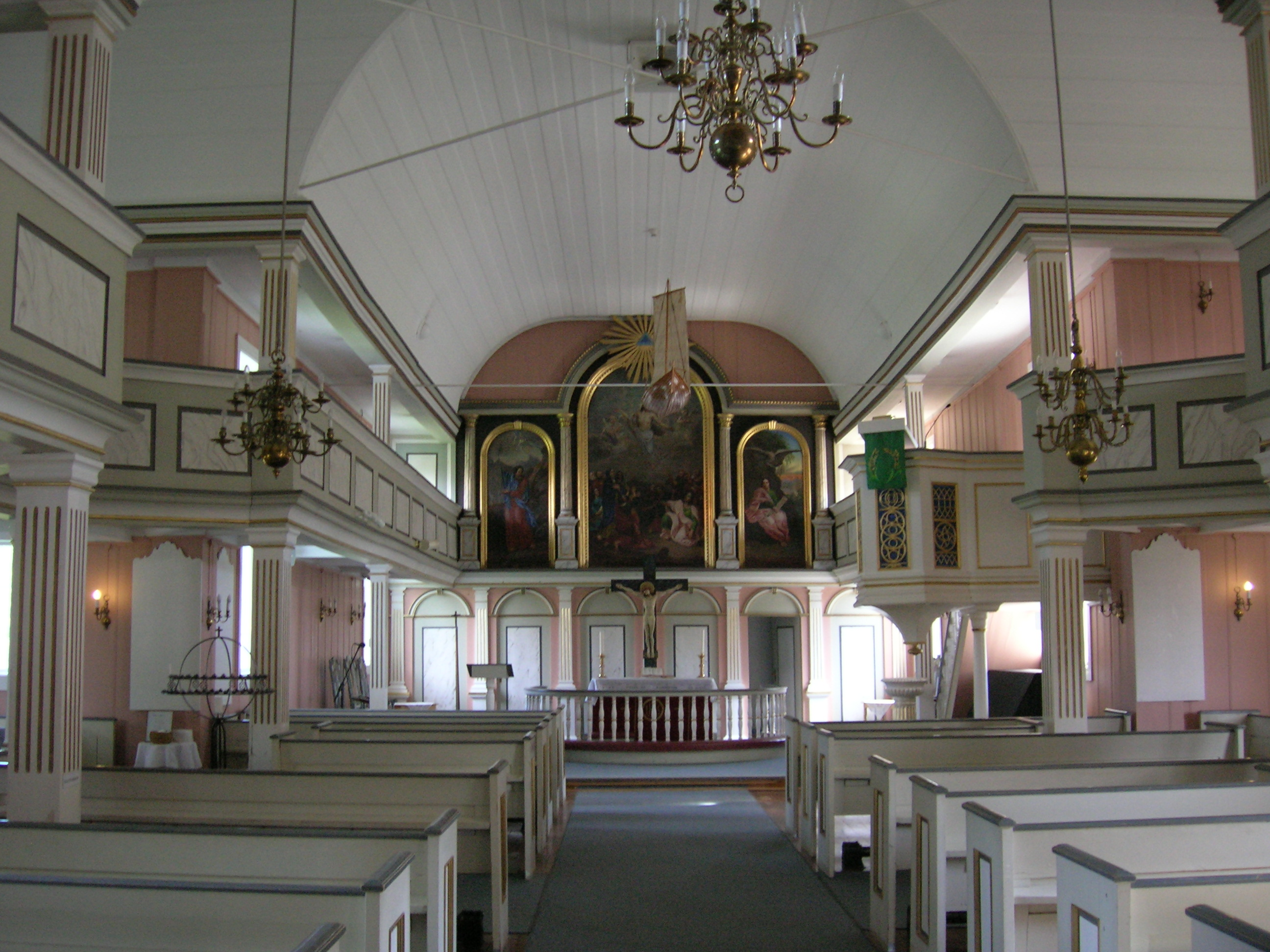

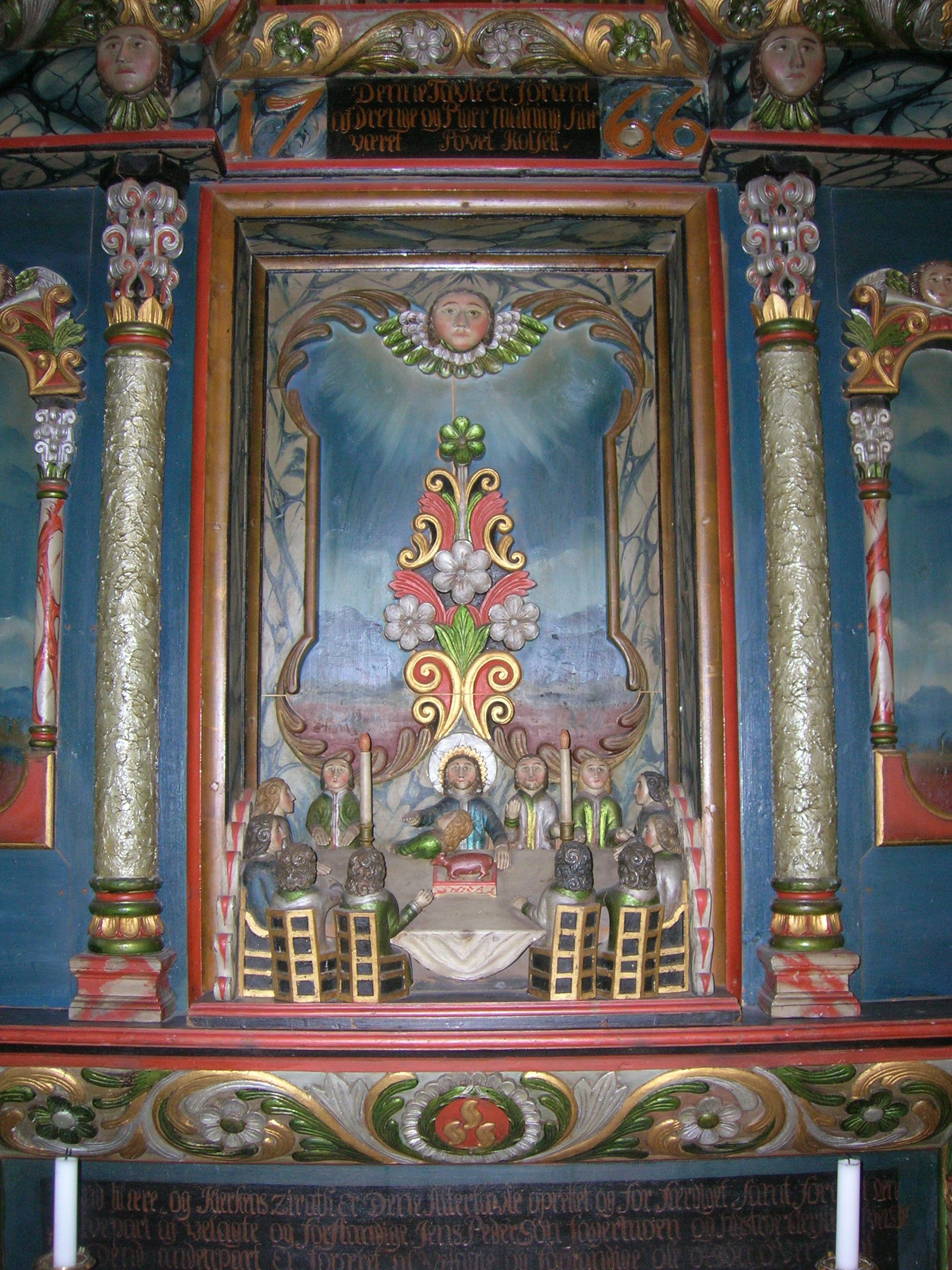

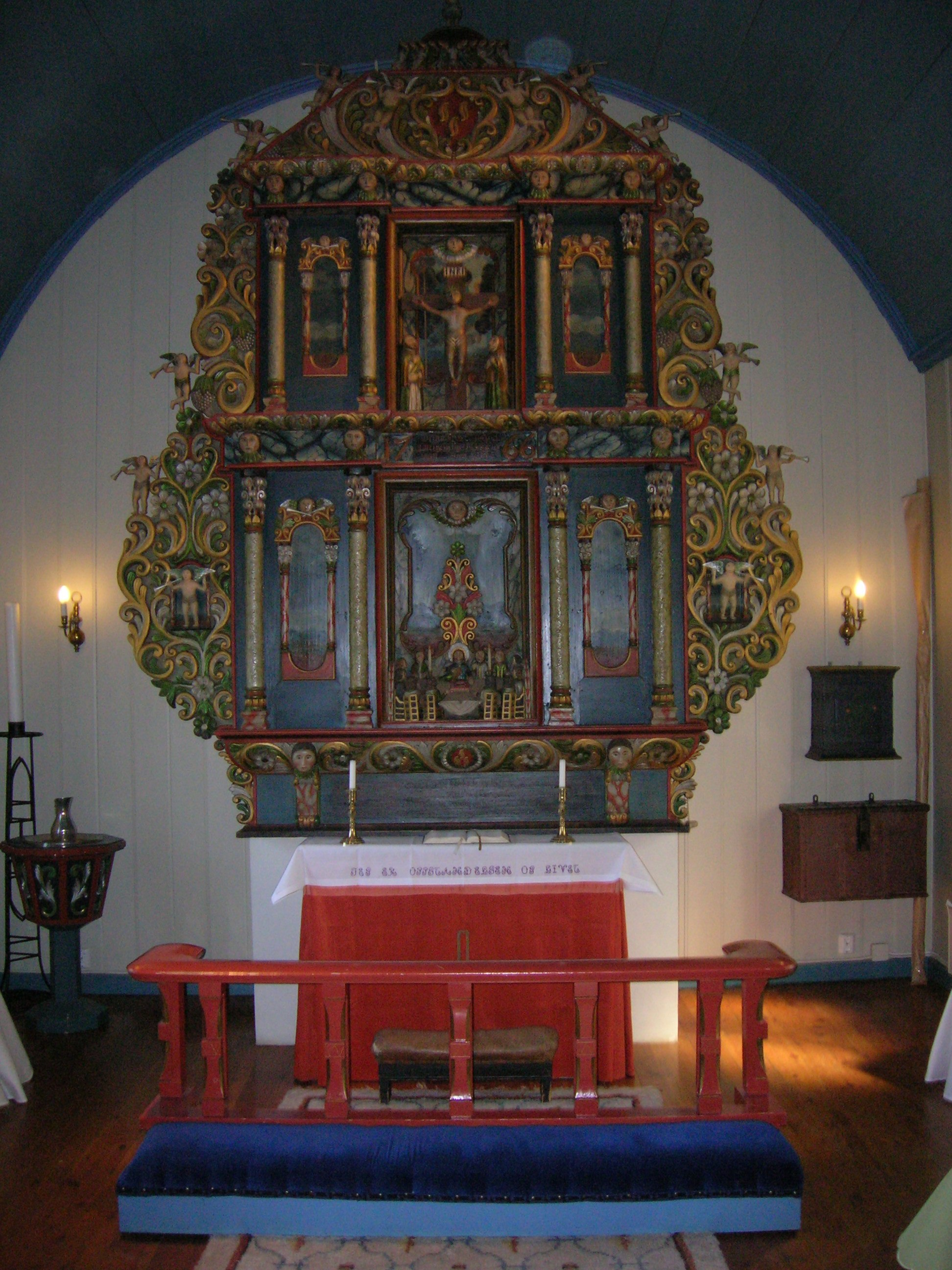

== See also ==
- List of churches in Sør-Hålogaland
