= Norsk Jernverk =

Former Norwegian industrial company

Norsk Jernverk is a former Norwegian industrial company which was founded in 1946 in Mo i Rana, fully owned by the Norwegian government. The production started in 1955. In 1985, it acquired the steel company Christiania Spigerverk, which was later again sold out as a separate company. Norsk Jernverk was later renamed Norsk Jern Holding, which was made into a private company in the 1990s, and was later taken over by the Finnish company Rautaruukki.
