= Christiania Spigerverk =

Norwegian steel company

Christiania Spigerverk is a steel company which was founded in Oslo in 1853 and developed into one of the largest industrial companies in Norway. In 1972, Christiania Spigerverk combined with Elkem, to become Elkem Spigerverket. It was sold to Norsk Jernverk in 1985, and it again split out as a separate company in 1993.

In 1929, Christiania Spigerverk demerged its nail and screw production into the subsidiary Forenede Nagle- og Skruefabriker, which also incorporated the competing enterprises Den Norske Naglefabrik and Kampens Skrue- og Møtrikfabrik. The production was still located in Nydalen.
