= Mo i Rana =

City in Nordland, Norway

- Town/City
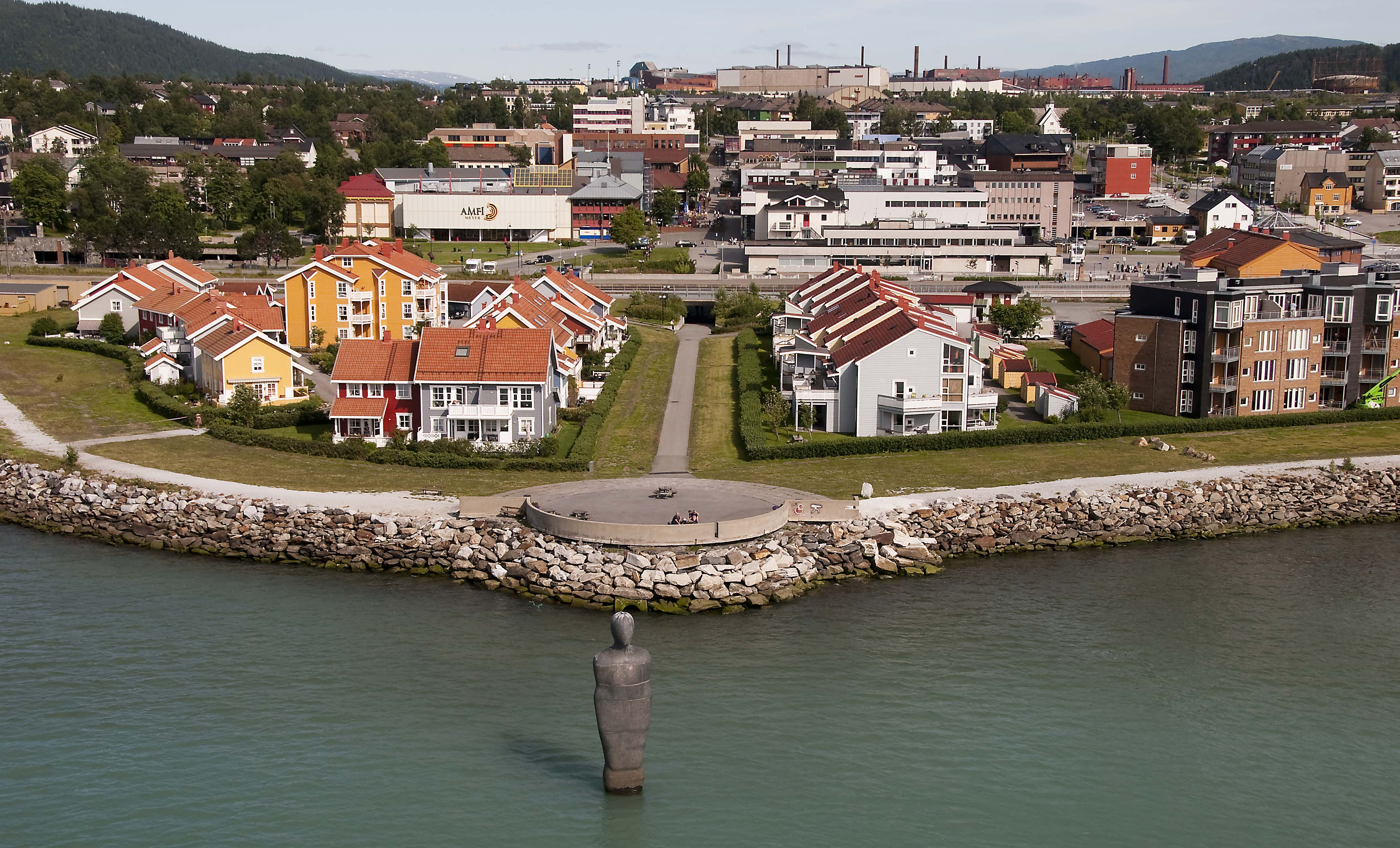
- View of the town from the fjord in July 2003
- Interactive map of Mo i Rana
- Location within Nordland Location within Norway
- Coordinates: 66.3128°N 14.1428°E
- Country: Norway
- Region: Northern Norway
- County: Nordland
- District: Helgeland
- Municipality: Rana Municipality
- Established as
- Ladested: 1923–1964
- Town (By): 1997

Area
  - Total: 12.9 km^{2} (5.0 sq mi)
- Elevation: 26 m (85 ft)

Population (2023)
  - Total: 18,755
  - Density: 1,454/km^{2} (3,770/sq mi)
- Demonym: Moværing
- Time zone: UTC+01:00 (CET)
  - Summer (DST): UTC+02:00 (CEST)
- Post Code: 8622 Mo i Rana
- Former municipality
- Mo ladested
- Coat of arms

- Location within Nordland Location within Norway
- Country: Norway
- County: Nordland
- District: Helgeland
- Established: 1 Jan 1923
  - Preceded by: Mo herred
- Disestablished: 1 Jan 1964
  - Succeeded by: Rana Municipality
- Administrative centre: Mo i Rana

Government
  - Mayor (1956–1963): Eilif Granhaug (Ap)

Area (upon dissolution)
  - Total: 3.2 km^{2} (1.2 sq mi)
  - Rank: #656 in Norway

Population (1963)
  - Total: 9,134
  - Rank: #81 in Norway
  - Density: 2,854.4/km^{2} (7,393/sq mi)
  - Change (10 years): ▲ +73.6%
- Time zone: UTC+01:00 (CET)
  - Summer (DST): UTC+02:00 (CEST)
- ISO 3166 code: NO-1803

Mo i Rana (Norwegian; pronounced [ˈmuː ɪ ˈrɑ̀ːnɑ]) or Måefie (Southern Sami) (and unofficially Ume Sami: Måhvie, Northern Sami: Muoffie) is a city, and the administrative centre of Rana Municipality in Nordland county, Norway. It is located in the Helgeland region of Nordland, just south of the Arctic Circle. Some of the city's suburbs include Båsmoen and Ytteren in the north, Gruben in the south east, Selfors in the east, and Åga/Hauknes/Dalsgrenda in the south.

The name "Mo i Rana" (English: Mo in Rana) is used to distinguish it from other places named Mo (including the town of Mosjøen, also located in Helgeland). The city's postal address was "Mo 8600" until 1999, when it was changed to "Mo i Rana 8600". Today, the postal address is "8622 Mo i Rana".

The 12.9-square-kilometre (3,200-acre) city has a population (2023) of 18,755 and a population density of 1,454 inhabitants per square kilometre (3,770/sq mi). This makes it the largest urban area in all of Helgeland, and the second largest city (after Bodø) in Nordland county.

== Name ==
Directly translated, the name Mo i Rana means "Mo in Rana". The town (originally the parish) is named after the old Mo farm (Old Norse: Móar) since the first Mo Church was built there and this is the site of the modern town of Mo. The name is derived from the word móar which is the plural form of mór which means "moorland". The last element is the name of the large Rana Municipality (Old Norse: Rana) which means "quick" or "fast", likely referring to the fast water flow in the Ranfjorden which flows past the town. Originally the village (and later the growing town) was generally known simply as Mo, but since many Norwegian settlements bear that name, disambiguating it by specifying it as the one that is located in Rana became commonplace. As the town grew and became more well-known nationwide, the longer form came to dominate. Locals may still refer to it simply as Mo. Also, the short name Mo may also be used as shorthand in contexts in which it is already established that one is referring to Mo i Rana.

== Education ==
In Mo i Rana, Nord University is located at Campus Helgeland just a short distance from shops, cafes and bars, cinema, theater, training facilities, and transport services including an airport. The campus hosts around 470 students from Nord University and 330 students from partner institutions. Campus Helgeland was opened in 2013 and is one of Norway's newest campuses.

Studentorganisasjonen Helgeland (SOH) is the student association at Nord University, Campus Helgeland. The organization was formed on 14 April 2013, and was previously known as Rana Studentforening, but this was changed when the organization became part of the regional mother-organization Studentorganisasjonen Nord in 2020.

== History ==
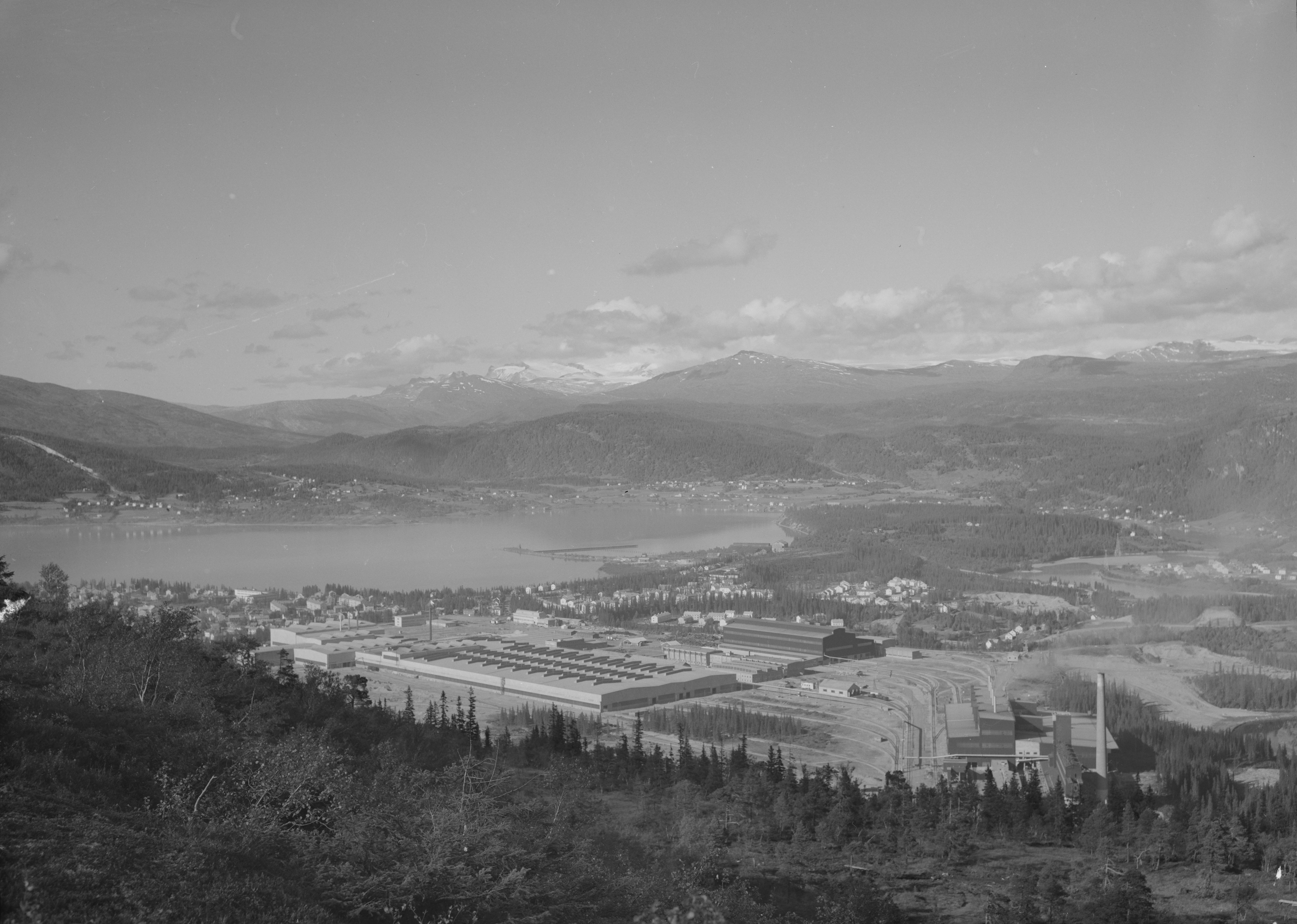
Norsk Jernverk, "Jernverket", Mo i Rana 15 September 1954

Mining, building boats (Nordlands boats), and hunting/fishing used to be the main ways of life in Rana. Starting in the summer of 1730, there was a Sámi market in Mo. The market was held on the main church grounds until 1810. In 1860, wholesale merchant L.A. Meyer started a trade center, licensed by royal authority. Meyer traded flour, herring and tobacco, reindeer meat, skins and venison with the Swedes. The trade with Sweden increased especially during Sweden's difficult economic years from 1892 to the start of the First World War. Many paths now used as hiking trails were originally trade paths for mountain dwellers from Sweden to Mo i Rana. One example is a path that starts in the Vindelfjällens Nature Reserve at Ammarnäs and follows the Vindel River valley, then joins Vindelkroken and eventually crosses the Norwegian border to Mo i Rana.

The municipality is rich on iron ores and water to produce power. This was very important for industrial development. The Dunderland Iron Ore Company (1902–1947), owned by Thomas Edison, established the first mines in Storforshei (27 kilometres or 17 miles north of Mo i Rana). The mining company Rana Gruber was also established in 1937, and in 1946, the Norwegian Parliament approved plans for the construction of an Iron mill in Norway. A/S Norwegian Iron Work Company was established.

In 1955, the first steel was produced for Norway and other countries. The construction of the iron works took nine years.

During this period the village of Mo i Rana became an industrial city. People from all over Norway moved to Mo i Rana for work. The community needed homes for thousands of new residents and, the construction of houses and residential blocks started immediately. Infrastructure such as electricity and water were established for the city. In 1930, the population was only 1300 people, but had increased to 7,000 by 1955. In 1978 The Iron Mill employed approximately 4,500 of the municipality's 25,000 inhabitants.

The Norwegian Parliament resolved in June 1988 to phase out state ownership of the company. Today there are 119 industrial companies located at the industrial estate (Mo Industrial Park). The companies mainly support the iron and steel industry, the engineering industry, the research and development service industry and the information technology industry. In total, the companies employ approximately 1900 people.

From the end of the Second World War until the early 1990s, Mo i Rana, with the town's steel mill as its cornerstone, was dependent upon heavy industry. Following the decline of heavy industry, new service industries have now grown in the town.

=== "Graveyard War" in 1951 ===
During the autumn of 1951, around "700 or 800" protesters showed up at the local graveyard as a result of a "night-time mobilisation" to oppose the government's attempt to remove Soviet corpses from graves. Some 93,000 Soviet prisoners-of-war had been brought to Norway between 1941 and 1945 by the Germans to work on improvements to infrastructure in Norway. A 2013 article in Dagbladet noted that "the protests were so powerful that [then minister of defence] Jens Chr. Hauge personally stopped the [government's] action".

It was only in this locality the government's Operation Asphalt stopped by civilians. More than 8000 Soviet corpses were removed from other graveyards in Northern Norway although the government had not decided the location of a new graveyard for these corpses. The protests in Mo i Rana were not mentioned in national media during the Cold War.

=== Municipal self-governance (1923–1964) ===
Ranen Municipality was established on 1 January 1838, under the old formannskapsdistrikt law. Shortly afterwards, in 1839, the municipality was divided into Nord-Ranen Municipality (in the north) and Sør-Ranen Municipality (in the south). In 1844, Nord-Ranen Municipality was renamed Mo Municipality (Norwegian: Mo herred). On 1 January 1923, the village of Mo was designated as a ladested and so it was separated from the rest of the municipality to become a town-municipality of its own. The new town of Mo (population: 1,305) kept the name Mo and the rest of the old municipality became known as Nord-Rana Municipality (bringing back the old name for the area).

During the 1960s, there were many municipal mergers across Norway due to the work of the Schei Committee. On 1 January 1964, Nord-Rana Municipality (population: 11,636) was merged with the town of Mo i Rana (population: 9,616), the part of Sør-Rana Municipality located north of the Ranfjorden (population: 697), and the Sjona area of Nesna Municipality (population: 543) to create the large, new Rana Municipality.

Mo was a self-governing municipality from 1923 until 1964. During that time, this municipality was responsible for primary education (through 10th grade), outpatient health services, senior citizen services, welfare and other social services, zoning, economic development, and municipal roads and utilities. The municipality was governed by a municipal council of directly elected representatives. The mayor was indirectly elected by a vote of the municipal council.

==== Municipal council ====
The municipal council (Bystyre) of Mo Municipality was made up of 29 representatives that were elected to four year terms. The tables below show the current and historical composition of the council by political party.

Mo bystyre 1959–1963
Party name (in Norwegian)	Number of representatives
Labour Party (Arbeiderpartiet)	18
Conservative Party (Høyre)	4
Communist Party (Kommunistiske Parti)	4
Christian Democratic Party (Kristelig Folkeparti)	1
Liberal Party (Venstre)	2
Total number of members:	29
Note: On 1 January 1964, the town of Mo became part of Rana Municipality.

Mo bystyre 1955–1959
Party name (in Norwegian)	Number of representatives
Labour Party (Arbeiderpartiet)	15
Conservative Party (Høyre)	4
Communist Party (Kommunistiske Parti)	6
Liberal Party (Venstre)	3
Local List(s) (Lokale lister)	1
Total number of members:	29

Mo bystyre 1951–1955
Party name (in Norwegian)	Number of representatives
Labour Party (Arbeiderpartiet)	15
Conservative Party (Høyre)	3
Communist Party (Kommunistiske Parti)	6
Liberal Party (Venstre)	3
Local List(s) (Lokale lister)	1
Total number of members:	28

Mo bystyre 1947–1951
Party name (in Norwegian)	Number of representatives
Labour Party (Arbeiderpartiet)	9
Conservative Party (Høyre)	3
Communist Party (Kommunistiske Parti)	6
Liberal Party (Venstre)	2
Total number of members:	20

Mo bystyre 1945–1947
Party name (in Norwegian)	Number of representatives
Labour Party (Arbeiderpartiet)	7
Communist Party (Kommunistiske Parti)	7
Joint List(s) of Non-Socialist Parties (Borgerlige Felleslister)	3
Local List(s) (Lokale lister)	3
Total number of members:	20

Mo bystyre 1937–1941*
Party name (in Norwegian)	Number of representatives
Labour Party (Arbeiderpartiet)	11
Joint List(s) of Non-Socialist Parties (Borgerlige Felleslister)	8
Local List(s) (Lokale lister)	1
Total number of members:	20
Note: Due to the German occupation of Norway during World War II, no elections were held for new municipal councils until after the war ended in 1945.

Mo bystyre 1934–1937
Party name (in Norwegian)	Number of representatives
Labour Party (Arbeiderpartiet)	9
Communist Party (Kommunistiske Parti)	1
Liberal Party (Venstre)	3
Local List(s) (Lokale lister)	1
Non-Socialist Group (Borgerlig Samling)	6
Total number of members:	20

==== Mayors ====
The mayor (Norwegian: ordfører) of Mo Municipality was the political leader of the municipality and the chairperson of the municipal council. Here is a list of people who held this position:

- 1923–1923: Einar Nilsen
- 1924–1924: C. N. Jacobsen
- 1925–1925: Einar Nilsen
- 1926–1929: Kristian P. Evjen
- 1930–1931: Alf Ljones
- 1931–1932: Carsten Venes
- 1932–1935: Per Kristian Rygh
- 1936–1937: Anton Getz
- 1937–1940: Alf Ljones
- 1945–1947: Sigurd Marsten
- 1947–1948: Alf Ljones
- 1948–1955: Erling Lange
- 1956–1963: Eilif Granhaug (Ap)

== Industry ==
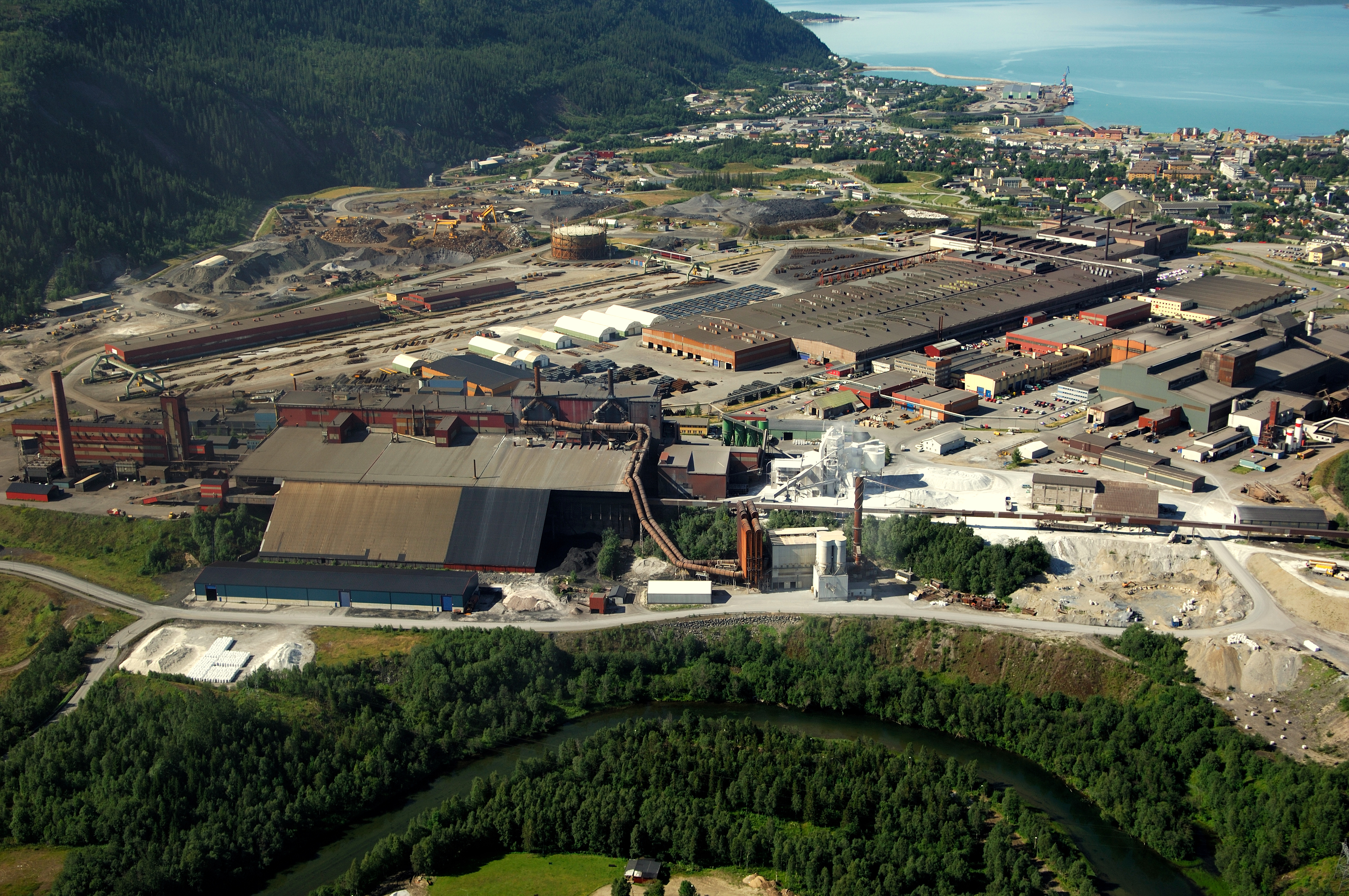
Mo Industrial Park. One of Norway's largest industrial parks.

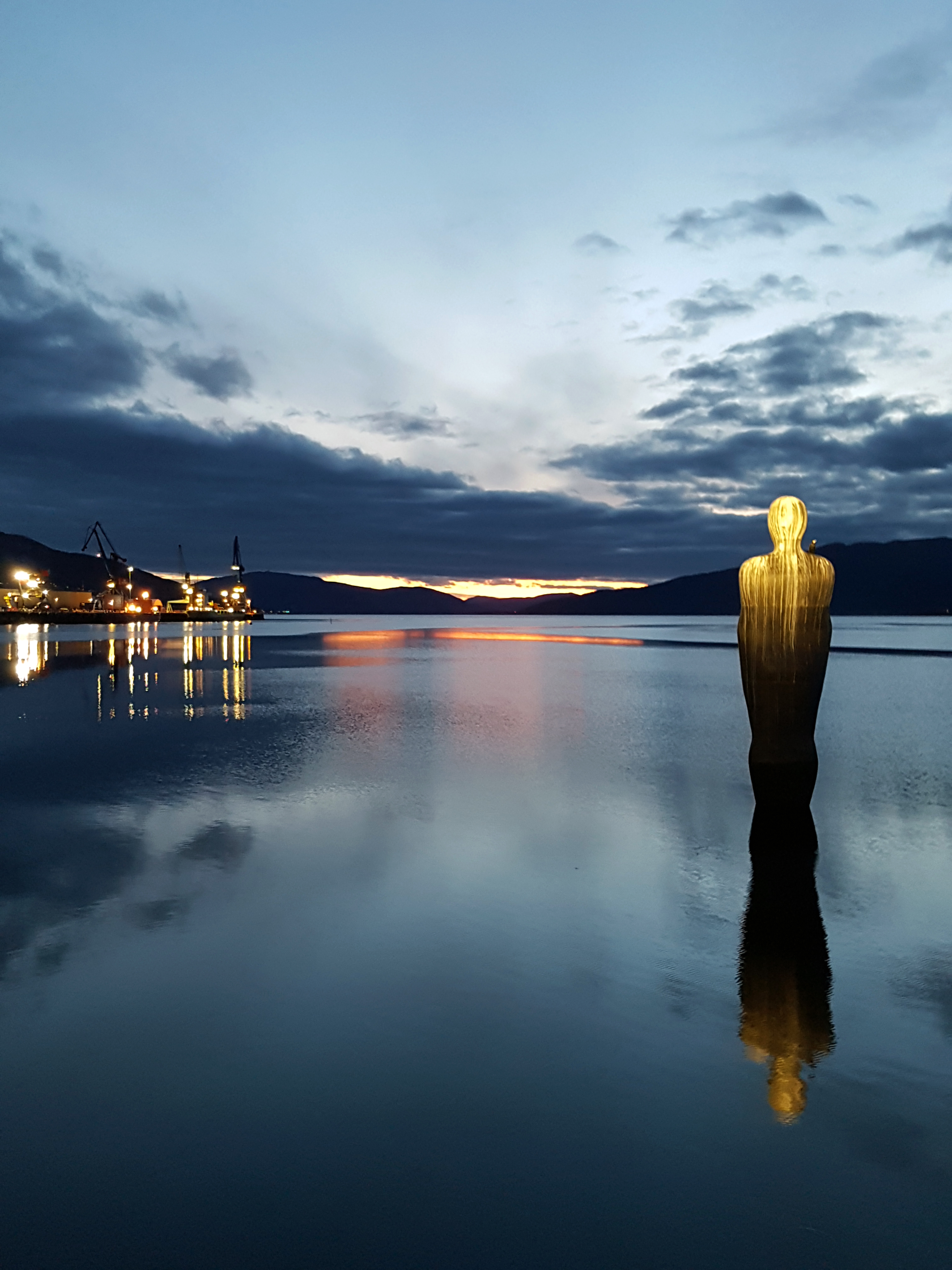
"Havmannen", a sculpture made from Arctic granite in 1995 by the English sculptor Antony Gormley.

Mo Industrial Park is one of Norway's largest industrial parks. It is important for the local society, giving work to approximately 1900 people. As of 2023, FREYR has a so-called test factory for battery technology; the size of the factory is 13,000 square meters. The company said that it will be minimizing investments in 2024.

The National Library of Norway has a division in Mo i Rana. HelgelandsKraft supplies electric power to the Helgeland region. NRK (Norwegian Broadcasting Corporation) has a division in Mo i Rana. Rana Blad and Rana No Are the towns local newspapers. Radio 3 Rana is the local radio station.

Norsk Jernverk, established in 1946, produced steel for the country until 1988, when it was divided into several new companies. The iron mill had a significant impact on the town development.

In 1978, the city's population had grown from approximately 2000 to 25,000.

== Transport ==
Mo i Rana has a regional airport, Mo i Rana Airport, Røssvoll, situated 10 kilometres (6.2 mi) north of the city in Røssvoll. The airport is a part of the Norwegian STOLport network. Mo i Rana is connected to the Nordland Line railway. This is a railway line between Trondheim and Bodø. The main north–south road in Norway, European route E6, passes through the city. The European route E12 begins in Mo i Rana and connect the city to Sweden and Finland. A bus network runs throughout most of the city and its suburbs.

An international tourist route Blue Highway (in Norwegian: Blå vegen) begins in Mo i Rana. The route goes via Sweden and Finland to Russia.

== Culture ==
Havmann (English: The Man from the Sea) is a sculpture made from Arctic granite located in the Ranfjord. It was made in 1995 by the English sculptor Antony Gormley. It is a part of Artscape Nordland, which can be seen from the city centre. The festival Havmanndagene is held in the town every year in May. Nordland Theater is a regional theater that tours in Nordland. It was established in 1979, and is situated in a new theater building with three stages.

Rana Museum, department of Helgeland Museum, is located in the new museum building "MOment" (2020), situated by the fjord. The museum has a special focus on industrial history, and the main exhibition shows everything from large machines to listening stations with films from old Rana. The industrial adventure and the development that happened also changed the fashion and peoples homes, also showcased through interiors and clothes from the 1960s and 70s.

The county library of Nordland is situated in Mo i Rana. Arctic Circle Raceway is a motorsports and road racing track, situated 30 kilometres (19 mi) north of Mo i Rana.

== Churches ==
Mo Church is the oldest building in Mo i Rana. Built in 1724, it is made of wood and has 400 seats. The church was built on the initiative of Thomas von Westen, a Norwegian priest and missionary who worked among the Sami. Numerous victims of World War II are buried in the graveyard, which receives visitors from the entire world in search of relatives. Gruben Church is another church in Mo i Rana. It was built in 1965 to serve the growing town. In 1977, Ytteren Church was also built.

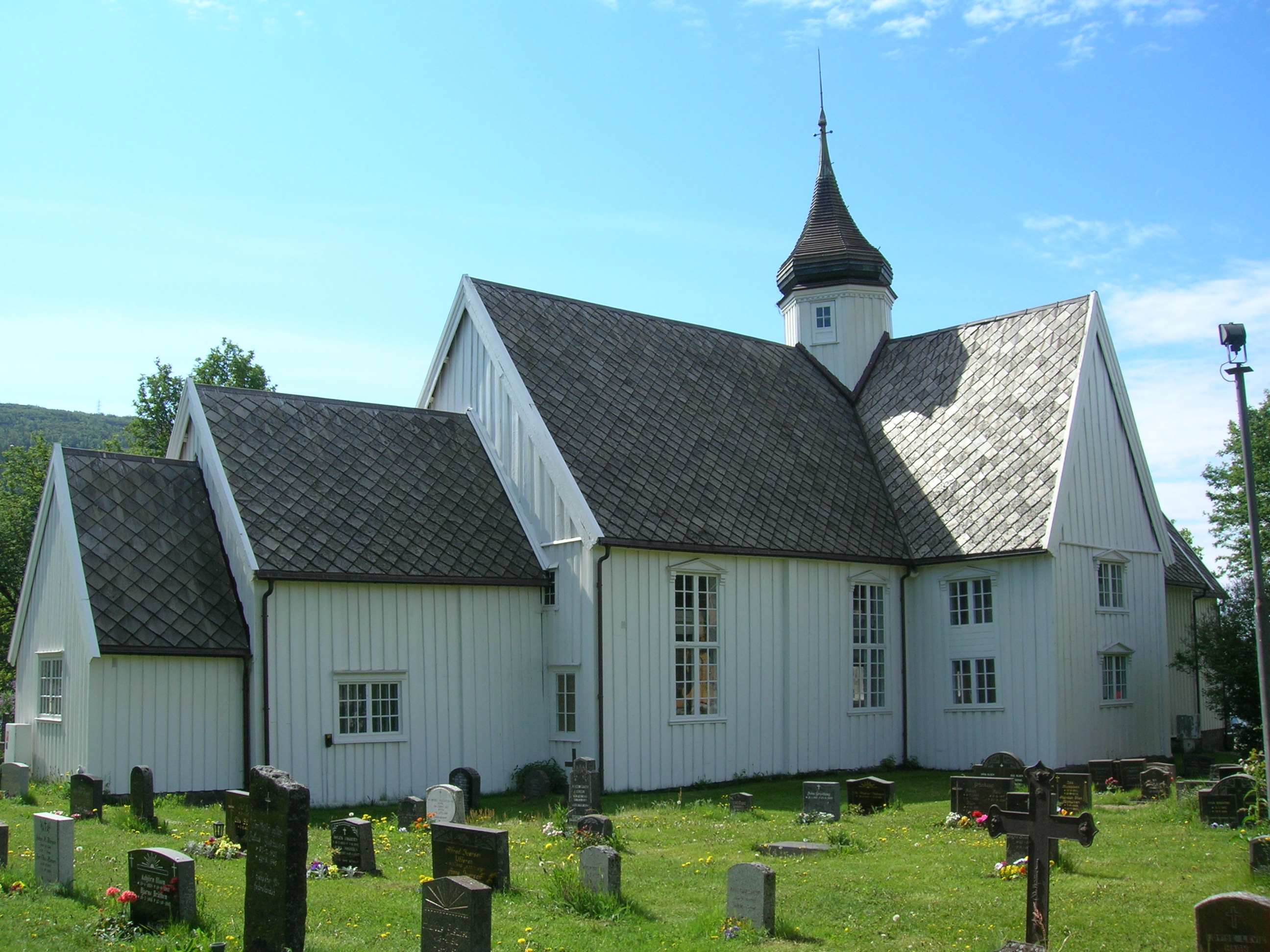
Mo Church

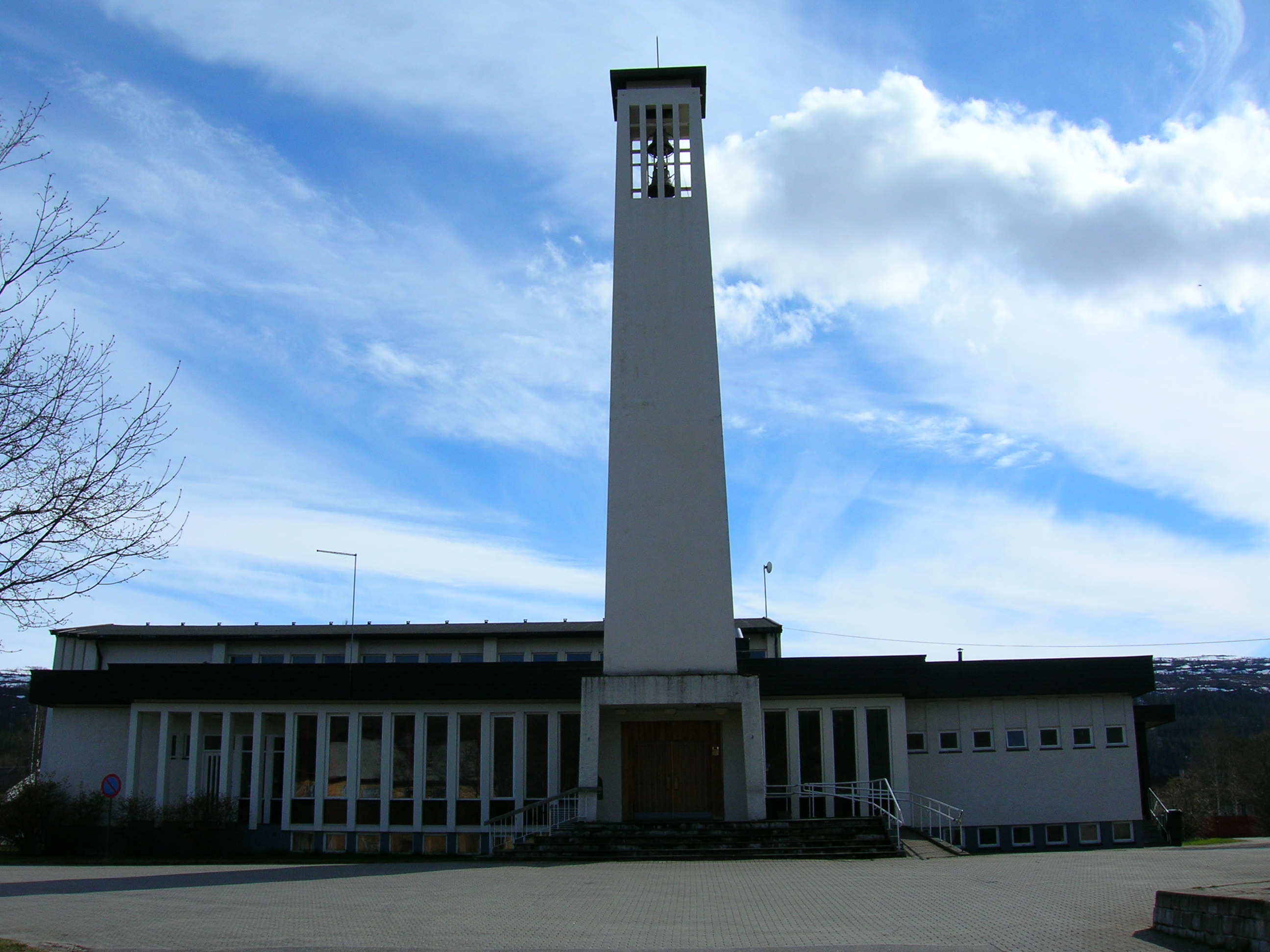
Gruben Church

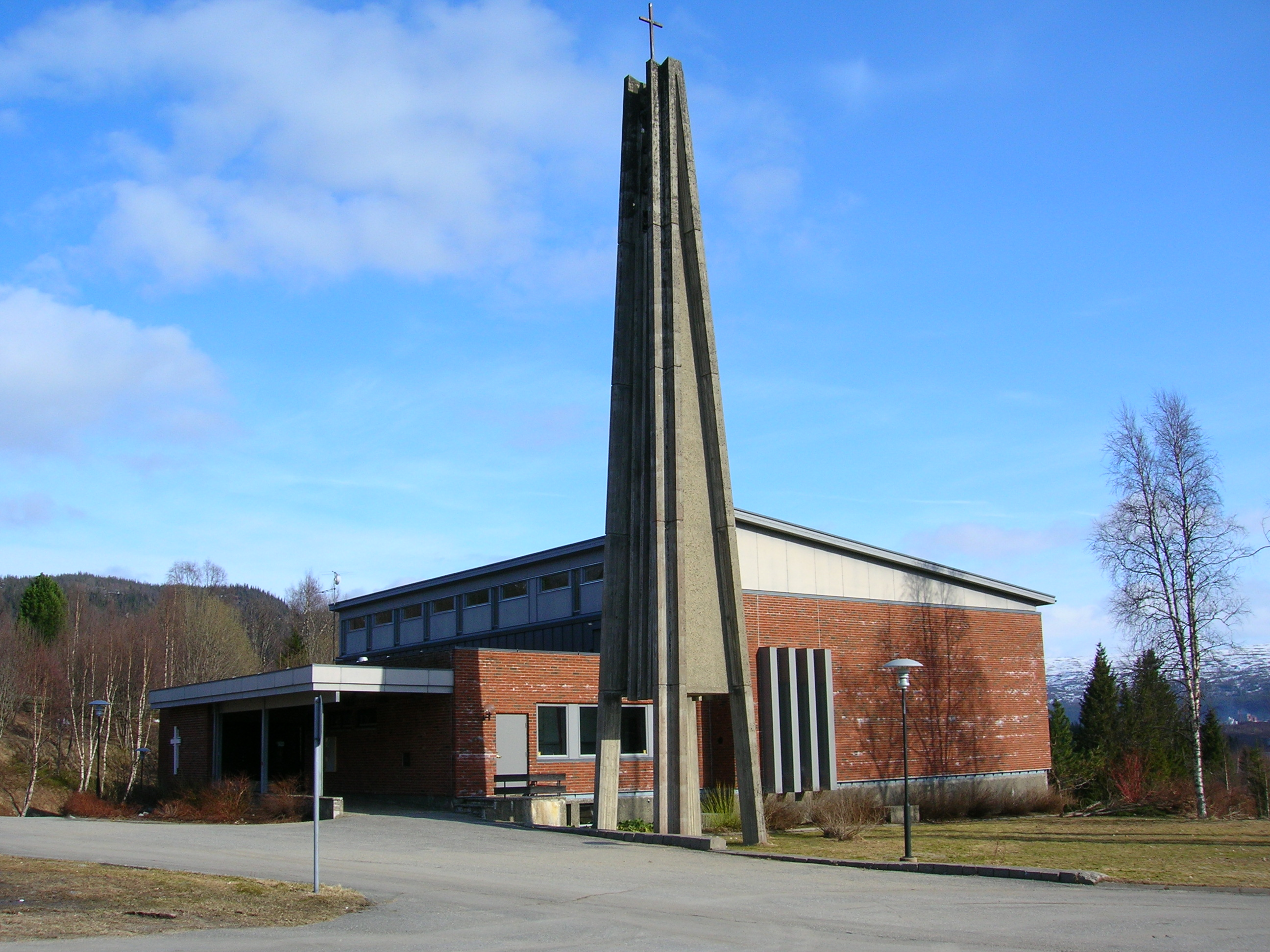
Ytteren Church

== Geography ==
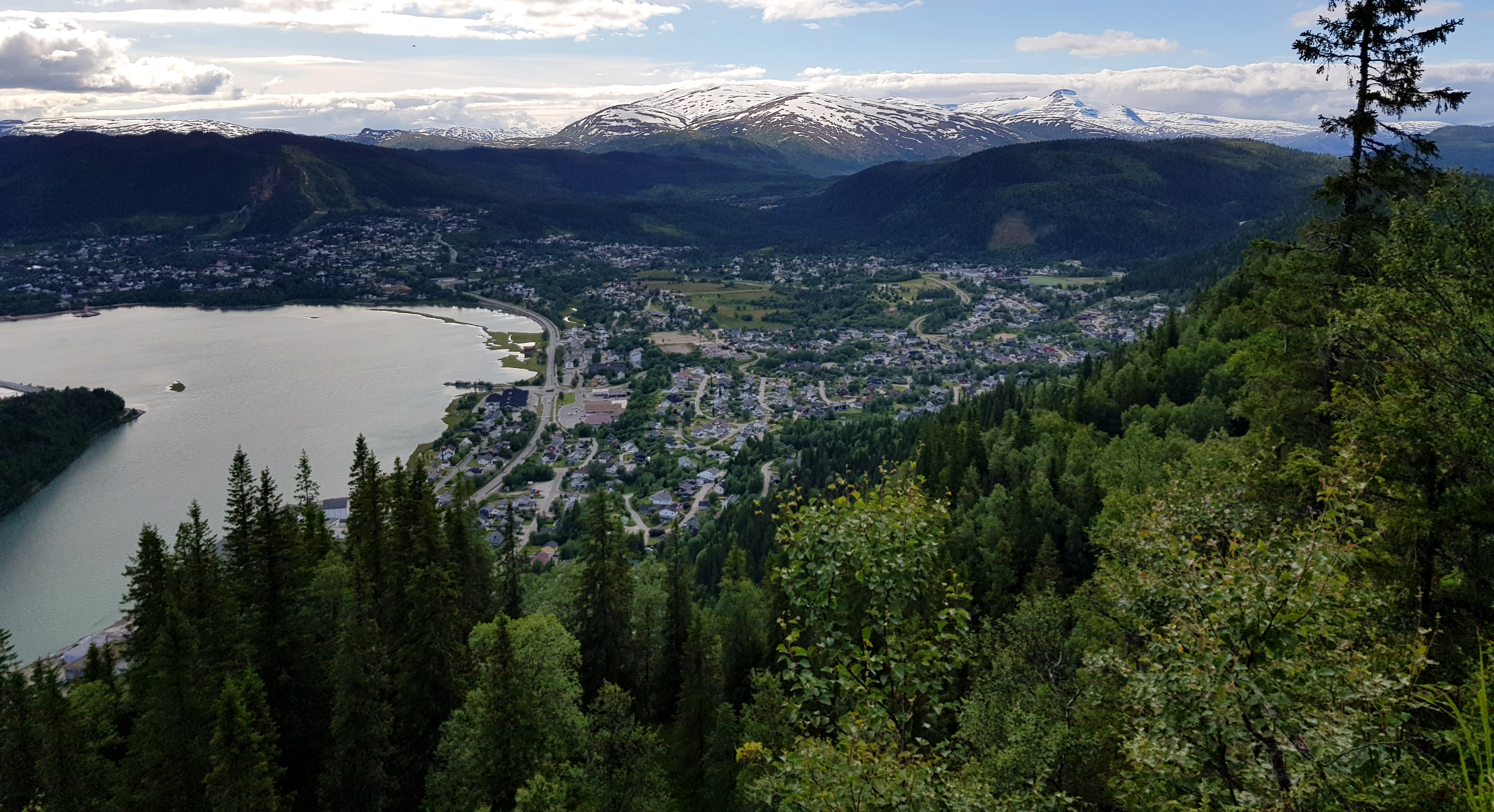
View over Ranelva and the suburb Ytteren, seen from a local hike-track viewpoint called "Tjuvtrappa".

Mo i Rana is located at the head of Ranfjorden, just on the southern side of the Saltfjellet mountains with the Svartisen glacier, Norway's second largest. The river Ranelva meets the Ranfjorden in Mo i Rana. Rana and Saltfjellet are famous for their numerous caves. Two of the caves are open to the public, Grønligrotta and Setergrotta. Mo i Rana is situated about 30 kilometres (19 mi) south of the Arctic Circle.

== Climate ==
Mo i Rana's climate is usually classified as subarctic (Köppen Dfc bordering on Dsc), with long, cold winters, and short, warm summers. Mo I Rana is situated about 70 kilometres (43 mi) from the coast line, giving it colder winters than towns at the coast. There is much precipitation due to the mountains north and east of town, often with much snow in winter. Blizzards in winter can go on for hours, potentially creating traffic difficulties and cancelling flights. Because of Mo i Rana's latitude, summer days are very long and winter days are very short on daylight. In the winter season, the Northern Lights can be seen on the night sky. It varies in intensity, coloured from white green to deep red, and comes in different shapes, such as beams, arches and draperies.

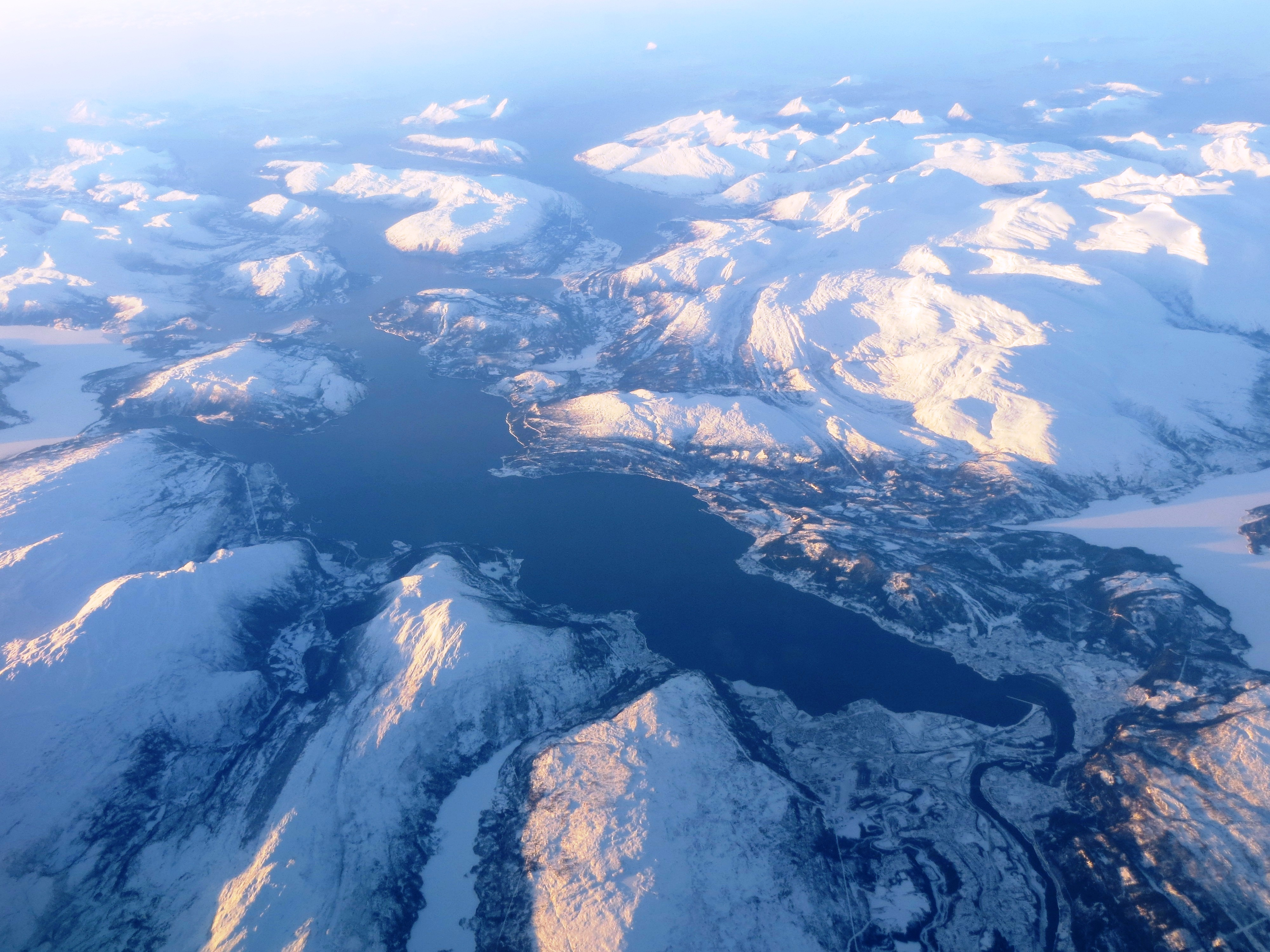
Sky view of Ranfjorden; Mo i Rana is down to the right; the river is also visible

July and August are the warmest months; July mean is 14.9 °C (58.8 °F) and average daily high 19 °C (66 °F) (1991–2020). There are usually two to three warm periods during the summer, when the average temperature is between 20 and 28 °C (68 and 82 °F) at daytime. The warm days may last for 2–14 days, with the temperature peaking at 31 °C (88 °F). On rare occasions, the overnight low does not go below 20 °C (68 °F), known in Norway as tropical night (tropenatt Norwegian).

Autumn begins in September. The trees lose their leaves in October, and the flowers disappear. During November, fresh water and rivers start to freeze, and the landscape is covered with snow. Only the spruce forest stays green throughout the winter. In the winter, the sun is low on the horizon, and is only visible for a few hours. Heating through sunlight is limited because of Mo i Rana's high-latitude location. Mountains block the sunlight when the sun is low on the horizon, which means that the sun is not visible at all during the month of December. There are normally two to three very cold periods in the winter with temperature dipping close to −30 °C (−22 °F). The cold periods normally last 3–7 days. The wettest period is autumn and winter, while spring and summer is the driest. The airport is situated in a valley 8 km away from the fjord, so the airport has colder lows than the town itself. The all-time high temperature is 33.0 °C (91.4 °F) recorded 27 July 2019 (beating 32.6 °C (90.7 °F) from July 2018); the all-time low at the airport is −35.2 °C (−31.4 °F) recorded 7 January 2010 (record low for Dec from 2010).

Climate data for Mo i Rana 1991–2020, extremes 1935–present (Note: Humidity and dew point data for Mo i Rana comes from weather stations near Mo i Rana Airport (Altitude 70m, SN79600). Temperature data for Mo i Rana have been recorded since 1935. The weather station data used from July 1935 to 1941 came from Mo i Rana (SN79470), and the weather station data used from August 1946 to December 1956 came from Mo i Rana. i Rana II (SN79510), weather station data from January 1957 to September 1965 are from Mo i Rana III (SN79480), and temperature data from 2002 to the present are from Mo i Rana Airport. Precipitation data refer to data recorded at the Røssvoll weather station from 1961 to 1990.)
Month	Jan	Feb	Mar	Apr	May	Jun	Jul	Aug	Sep	Oct	Nov	Dec	Year
Record high °C (°F)	8.0 (46.4)	9.2 (48.6)	12.4 (54.3)	18.3 (64.9)	28.3 (82.9)	30.9 (87.6)	33.0 (91.4)	30.6 (87.1)	26.2 (79.2)	17.2 (63.0)	12.0 (53.6)	8.1 (46.6)	33.0 (91.4)
Mean maximum °C (°F)	5.3 (41.5)	4.8 (40.6)	7.2 (45.0)	12.6 (54.7)	20.5 (68.9)	24.7 (76.5)	28.1 (82.6)	26.5 (79.7)	20.2 (68.4)	12.7 (54.9)	8.5 (47.3)	6.2 (43.2)	28.9 (84.0)
Mean daily maximum °C (°F)	−3.7 (25.3)	−2.9 (26.8)	0.9 (33.6)	6.0 (42.8)	11.1 (52.0)	15.4 (59.7)	19.3 (66.7)	18.0 (64.4)	12.9 (55.2)	6.1 (43.0)	0.7 (33.3)	−1.5 (29.3)	6.9 (44.4)
Daily mean °C (°F)	−5.9 (21.4)	−4.7 (23.5)	−2.9 (26.8)	2.0 (35.6)	6.9 (44.4)	11.1 (52.0)	14.8 (58.6)	13.7 (56.7)	9.7 (49.5)	3.5 (38.3)	−0.7 (30.7)	−3.3 (26.1)	3.7 (38.7)
Mean daily minimum °C (°F)	−8.1 (17.4)	−7.5 (18.5)	−7.0 (19.4)	−2.0 (28.4)	2.6 (36.7)	7.0 (44.6)	10.2 (50.4)	9.2 (48.6)	6.1 (43.0)	1.0 (33.8)	−2.5 (27.5)	−5.4 (22.3)	0.3 (32.5)
Mean minimum °C (°F)	−24.4 (−11.9)	−24.1 (−11.4)	−19.8 (−3.6)	−11.4 (11.5)	−3.6 (25.5)	0.3 (32.5)	3.6 (38.5)	2.0 (35.6)	−1.6 (29.1)	−8.7 (16.3)	−14.0 (6.8)	−19.0 (−2.2)	−27.7 (−17.9)
Record low °C (°F)	−35.2 (−31.4)	−30.7 (−23.3)	−31.0 (−23.8)	−17.2 (1.0)	−8.0 (17.6)	−2.2 (28.0)	0.0 (32.0)	−2.0 (28.4)	−5.7 (21.7)	−17.6 (0.3)	−27.1 (−16.8)	−29.8 (−21.6)	−35.2 (−31.4)
Average precipitation mm (inches)	146 (5.7)	117 (4.6)	112 (4.4)	74 (2.9)	64 (2.5)	70 (2.8)	97 (3.8)	110 (4.3)	155 (6.1)	186 (7.3)	136 (5.4)	163 (6.4)	1,430 (56.3)
Average relative humidity (%)	80	80	76	74	69	68	71	76	82	83	85	83	77
Average dew point °C (°F)	−9.5 (14.9)	−9.3 (15.3)	−6.4 (20.5)	−2.6 (27.3)	0.9 (33.6)	5.1 (41.2)	9.1 (48.4)	8.7 (47.7)	5.8 (42.4)	0.5 (32.9)	−3.5 (25.7)	−6.0 (21.2)	−0.6 (30.9)
Source 1: Norwegian Meteorological Institute
Source 2: Weather Online, yr.no climate statistics Mo i Rana airport

== International relations ==
=== Twin towns – Sister cities ===
Mo i Rana is twinned with:

- Fairbanks, Alaska, United States
- Skellefteå, Västerbotten, Sweden
- Aars, North Jutland, Denmark

Mo i Rana was formerly twinned with the Russian city of Petrozavodsk, but the city council terminated its ties to the city after learning that the mayor of Petrozavodsk joined the Akhmat battalions and participated in the Russian invasion of Ukraine.

== Notable people ==
Trond Sollied Trond Gøran Pedersen Frode Fagermo Elin Nilsen Tom Sandberg Thor André Olsen Kenneth Braaten

== Farms of Mo ==
=== Map of the farms of Mo ===
Coordinates are approximate.
Note that each map has a maximum number of listings it can display, so the map has been divided into parts consistent with the enumeration districts (tellingskrets) in the 1920 census. This map will include one farm name per farm number; other farm names or subdivision numbers may exist.

Mo municipality, tellingskrets 1-6, from 1920 census
Farms:
1 1: Yterviken
2 3: Hesjevik
3 4: Førnes
4 5: Oldermo
5 6: Øverdal
6 7: Moen
7 8: Hulbekkmo
8 9: Storbjerkmo
9 11: Aakermobakken
10 12: Ødegaard
11 13: Stien
12 14: Nerdal
13 15: Sjånes
14 16: Bjørnbærvik
15 17: Hauknes
16 18: Andfiskå
17 19: Andfiskvatne
18 20, 21: Mo
19 22: Grubben, nedre
20 23: Trethammar
21 24: Grubben øvre
22 25: Brendaasen
23 26: Kjemphei
24 27: Ilgrubben
25 28: Rauvatnet
26 29: Tværvatnet
27 147: Umbukten
28 30: Villen
29 31: Gåskjønmo
30 32: Fagerli
31 33: Stenbækhaug
32 34: Skugheien
33 35: Granhei
34 36: Fiskkjønli
35 37: Fagerdal
36 38: Seterdal
37 39: Lapvamo
38 40: Malmbek
39 41: Seljelid
40 42: Stilvasstrand
41 43: Jordbro
42 44: Taperskar
43 45: Toftli
44 46: Rørapet
45 47: Langfjell

Tellingskrets (enumeration districts): 1, Dalsgrenn (lime); 2, Sjånes - Andfiskvatne (red); 3, Mo (blue); 4, Gruben - Umbugtenø (green); 5, Villen - Fiskkjønli (black); 6, Plurdalen (purple).

Mo municipality, tellingskrets 7-10, from 1920 census
Farms:
1 48: Bergli
2 49: Plurhei
3 50: Skonseng
4 51: Tetinghei
5 52: Svartvashei
6 93: Sanhei
7 94: Røsvoll
8 54: Nævernes søndre
9 55: Kvanli
10 56: Rablen
11 57: Granli
12 58: Østerdal
13 59: Rundhaugen
14 60: Bjurbækmo
15 61: Krogli
16 62: Snasen
17 63: Silaamoen
18 64: Silaadal
19 65: Grønfjeld
20 68: Dunderland, søndre
21 69: Messingsletten
22 70: Messingsletsæter
23 71: Storvoll
24 72: Hjertås, nedre
25 73: Hjertås, øvre
26 74: Krokstrand, søndre
27 75: Krokstrand, nordre
28 76: Rødfjell
29 77: Bjellånes
30 78: Stormdalshei
31 79: Dunderland, nordre
32 80: Strandjord
33 81: Almli, øvre
34 82: Ørfjellmo
35 147: Andfjell
36 53: Bjørnhei
37 65: Grønfjeldnes
38 66: Stupforsmo
39 67: Guldbekhei
40 83: Eiteraa
41 84: Almlid nedre
42 85: Storehei
43 86: Nævernes
44 87: Storforshei
45 88: Kvitenget
46 89: Tørbekmo
47 90: Urtfjeld
48 91: Vesteraalid
49 92: Nævermoen

Tellingskrets (enumeration districts): 7, Skonseng (lime); 8, Grønfjelddalen (red); 9, Øvre Dunderlandsdalen (blue); 10, Eiteraa - Urtfjeld (green).

Mo municipality, tellingskrets 11-16 from 1920 census
Farms:
1 96: Elvebakken
2 97: Bjørnsletten
3 98: Aaenget
4 99: Selfors
5 112: Kjelungneset
6 100: Rufsholm
7 101: Øverbæklien
8 102: Vaseidet
9 103: Røvatnet store
10 104: Blakkåheien
11 105: Rørvatnet lille
12 106: Tveråmoen
13 107: Svartisheien
14 108: Asphaugen
15 109: Bjørnåen
16 110: Langvatnet
17 111: Bosolen
18 114: Bjørnådalen
19 113: Guldfjeld
20 115: Stenkjøndlien
21 116: Rausandaksel
22 117: Guldvik
23 118: Hammerneset
24 119: Ravnaamoen
25 120: Ravnaa
26 121: Granlund
27 122: Bergfos
28 123: Fiskkjønna
29 124: Lillvand
30 125: Leiraamoen
31 126: Møllehusmoen
32 127: Snefjeldaa
33 129: Øijord
34 130: Loftfjeld
35 131: Ytteren
36 132: Engevolden
37 133: Høgåsen
38 134: Baasmo
39 135: Steinneset
40 136: Laukberg
41 137: Rauberget
42 128: Brattland
43 138: Alterneset
44 139: Alteren
45 140: Skjærvik
46 141: Lillealteren
47 142: Forsmo
48 143: Heien
49 144: Volden
50 145: Sletten
51 146: Bustnes

Tellingskrets (enumeration districts): 11, Selfors - Langvashoved (lime); 12, Røvasdalen (red); 13, Langvasgrændenø (purple); 14, Ytteren (blue); 15, Enge - Røberg (green), 16, Alteren (black).

=== Farm names and numbers ===
The following are the farms in the Mo municipality, as they are listed in O. Rygh's series Norske Gaardnavne ("Norwegian farm names"), the Nordland volume of which was published in 1905.

The farm numbers are used in some census records, and numbers that are near each other indicate that those farms are geographically proximate. Handwritten Norwegian sources, particularly those prior to 1800, may use variants on these names. For recorded variants before 1723, see the digital version of O. Rygh. Note that the 1920 census records mapped above may not match O. Rygh.

Farm names were often used as part of Norwegian names, in addition to the person's given name and patronymic or inherited surname. Some families retained the farm name, or toponymic, as a surname when they emigrated, so in those cases tracing a surname may tell you specifically where in Norway the family was from. This tradition began to change in the mid to late 19th century, and inherited surnames were codified into law in 1923.

== See also ==
- Arctic Circle Raceway, local race track
- Blue Highway, tourist route
