= Helgeland Kammerkor =

Choir in Helgeland, Norway

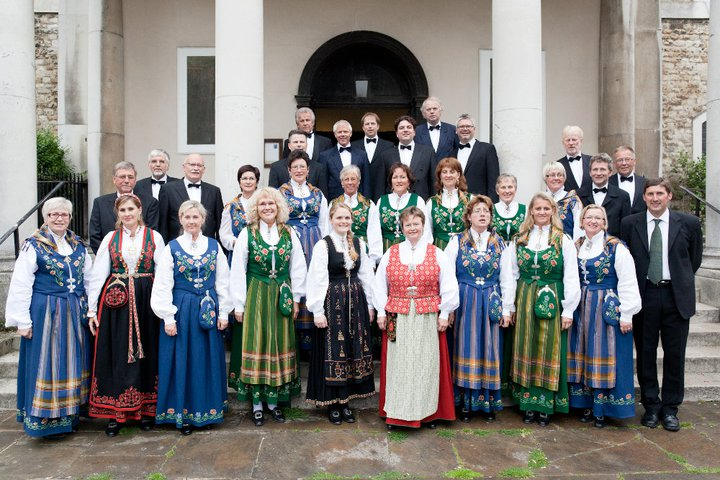
Helgeland Kammerkor before a concert in Lewisham, London, 2011

Helgeland Kammerkor is a mixed choir from the region of Helgeland in Northern Norway. The choir was founded in Sandnessjøen i 1992, and currently has around 30 members. The members of Helgeland Kammerkor meet once a month for rehearsals, and give concerts 4-5 times a year. The choir has a broad repertoire that includes church music, madrigals, Nordic folk music and large concert works such as Carmina Burana by Carl Orff. From 2009 to 2018 the choir was conducted by Christopher Eva.

Helgeland Kammerkor have recorded two CDs: Folketoner fra Helgeland (Folk music from Helgeland) in 2005, and Mennesket og skaperverket (Man and Creation) in 2012.

In the autumn of 2012 Helgeland Kammerkor celebrated their 20th anniversary with concerts on the Hurtigruten (Norwegian coastal ship) and in Lurøy Church. In March 2013 Helgeland Kammerkor were artist of the week on the local Norwegian radio station NRK Nordland, with music from the CD Mennesket og skaperverket. In 2016 Helgeland Kammerkor were featured in the Norwegian classical music magazine Klassisk Musikkmagasin. In 2017 the 25th anniversary of Helgeland Kammerkor was celebrated with a concert in Sandnessjøen, the town where the choir was founded. A profile of the choir in the magazine Bo & Lev på Helgeland, timed to coincide with the anniversary, notes that for 25 years the choir has been a good example of regional cooperation.

== Recent activity ==
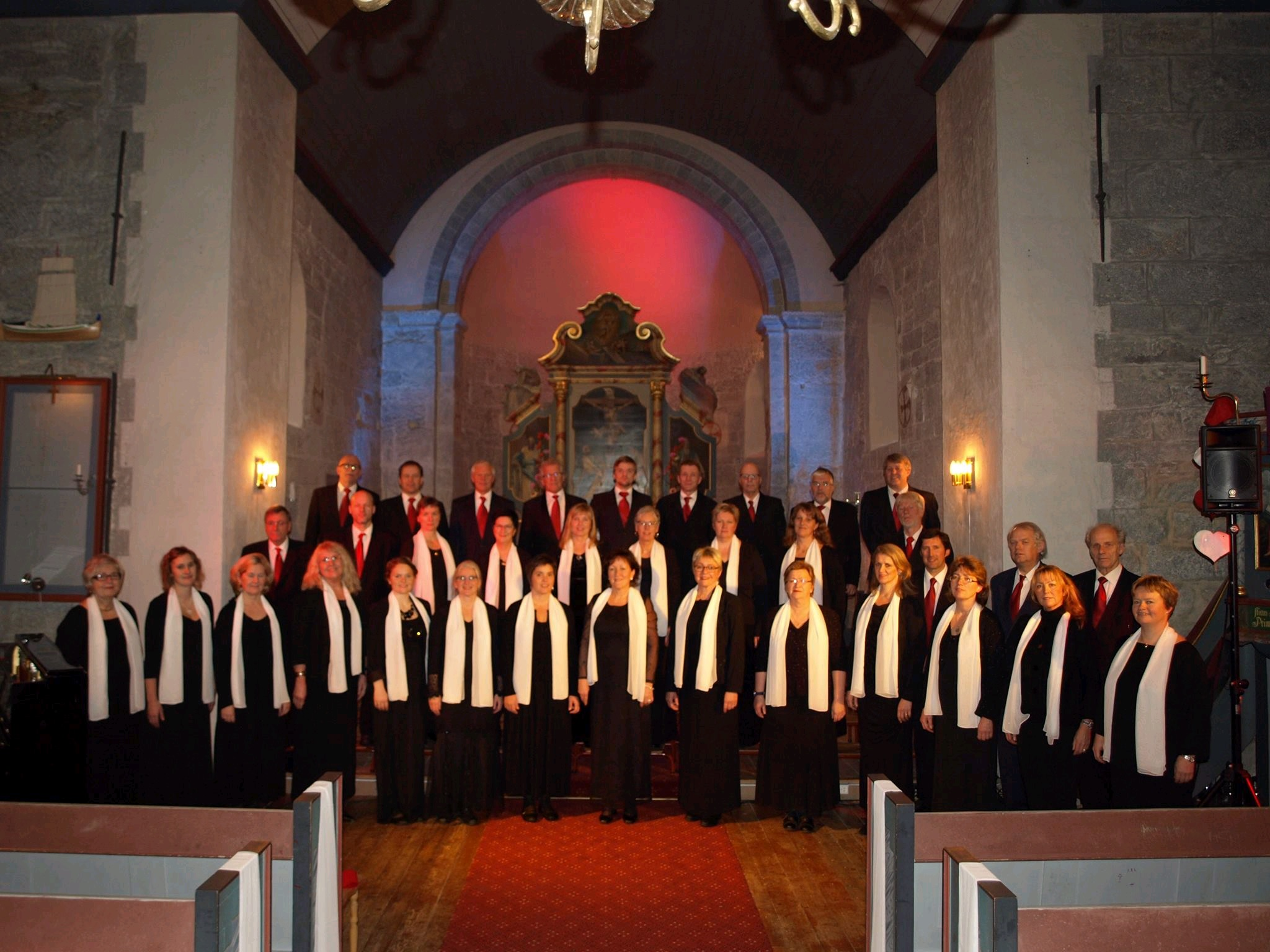
Helgeland Kammerkor giving a Christmas concert in Herøy Church (Nordland), 2013

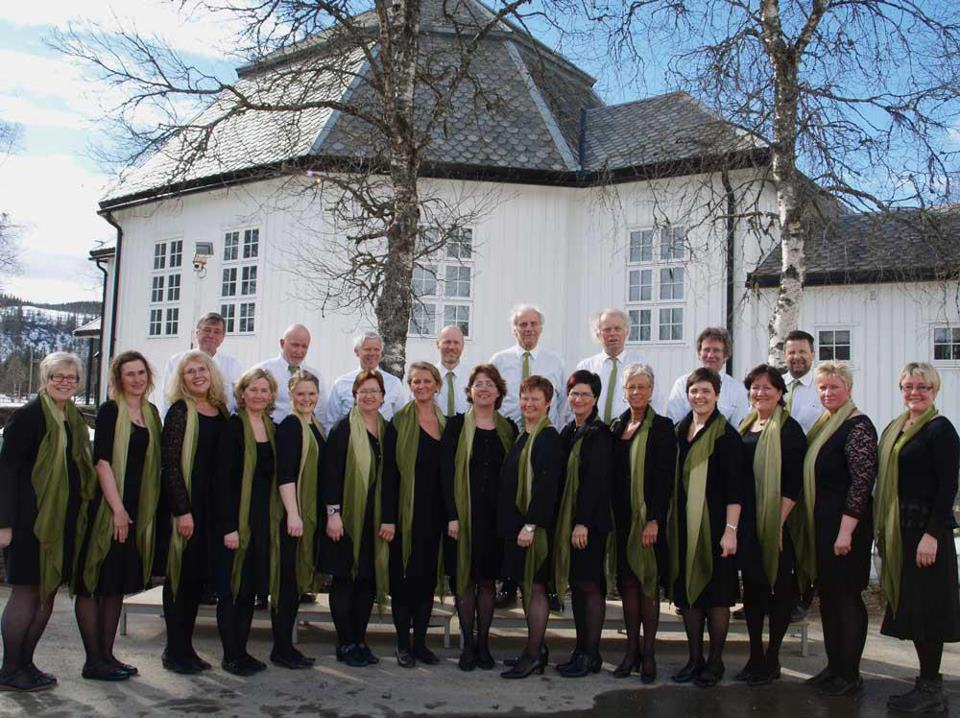
Helgeland Kammerkor at Røssvoll Church in Rana Municipality, 2013

- 2018. January: concert in Mo Church (Nordland). May: Spring concert in Dønnes Church (Dønna Municipality). June: concert in Susendal Church (Hattfjelldal Municipality).
- 2017. April: music for Lent and Easter in Alstahaug Church, one of seven surviving medieval-era churches in northern Norway. June: choir tour to Dublin, Ireland. October: 25th anniversary concert in the new concert hall (Kulturbadet) in Sandnessjøen. December: Christmas concerts in Leirfjord Church and Drevja Church.
- 2016. April: Kor perler (choral pearls) presented in collaboration with the ensemble KammeRana, with concerts in Nesna Municipality and Mo i Rana. June: concert in Lurøy Church. August: concert to celebrate the centenary of Sjona Church in Rana Municipality. October: folk music and madrigals in Sjøgata, a picturesque street in Mosjøen. December: the choir sings for an international audience on the Hurtigruten ship MS Nordlys, followed by a Christmas concert in Brønnøy Church.
- 2015. January: opening concert for Mo Kirkemusikkfestival, a new festival of church music in Mo Church (Nordland). April: Concert performance of Carmina Burana by Carl Orff in collaboration with KammeRana, with concerts in Herøy Municipality, Sandnessjøen, Hemnesberget, and Mo i Rana. December: Christmas concerts in Hattfjelldal Church and Tärnaby church, Sweden.
- 2014. May: Concert performance of Carmina Burana by Carl Orff in collaboration with KammeRana, with concerts in Mosjøen, Sandnessjøen, Nesna Municipality and Mo i Rana. June: choir tour to Reykjavík, Iceland. October: concerts in Korgen Church and Drevja Church. December: Christmas concerts in Sandnessjøen Church and Dønnes Church.
- 2013. Spring concerts in Sandnessjøen Church, Røssvoll Church, Mo Church (Nordland) and Vega Church. Christmas concerts in Sandnessjøen Church and Herøy Church (Nordland).
- 2012. Spring concerts on the islands of Lovund (celebrating the return on 14 April of the puffin breeding colony) and Dønna Municipality (celebrating the annual unveiling of the phallic stone). 20th anniversary concert in Lurøy Church.
- 2011. June: choir tour to London with a concert in St Mary’s Church, Lewisham. December: Christmas concert in Tärnaby church, Sweden.

== International tours ==
- London, England (2011). Helgeland Kammerkor sang in the Norwegian church in London (St Olav's Church) and gave a concert in St Mary's Church in Lewisham. The choir also visited Greenwich and sang in front of the statue of James Wolfe in Greenwich Park.
- Reykjavík, Iceland (2014). Helgeland Kammerkor sang in Fella- and Hóla Church, the Nordic House and Harpa Concert Hall.
- Dublin, Ireland (2017). Concerts in Christ Church Cathedral and St Stephen's Green. The choir also sang on the terrace of Powerscourt House, County Wicklow, and beside the statue of Molly Malone in Suffolk Street, Dublin.

In 2011 and 2015 Helgeland Kammerkor gave Christmas concerts in Tärnaby, Sweden.

== Discography ==
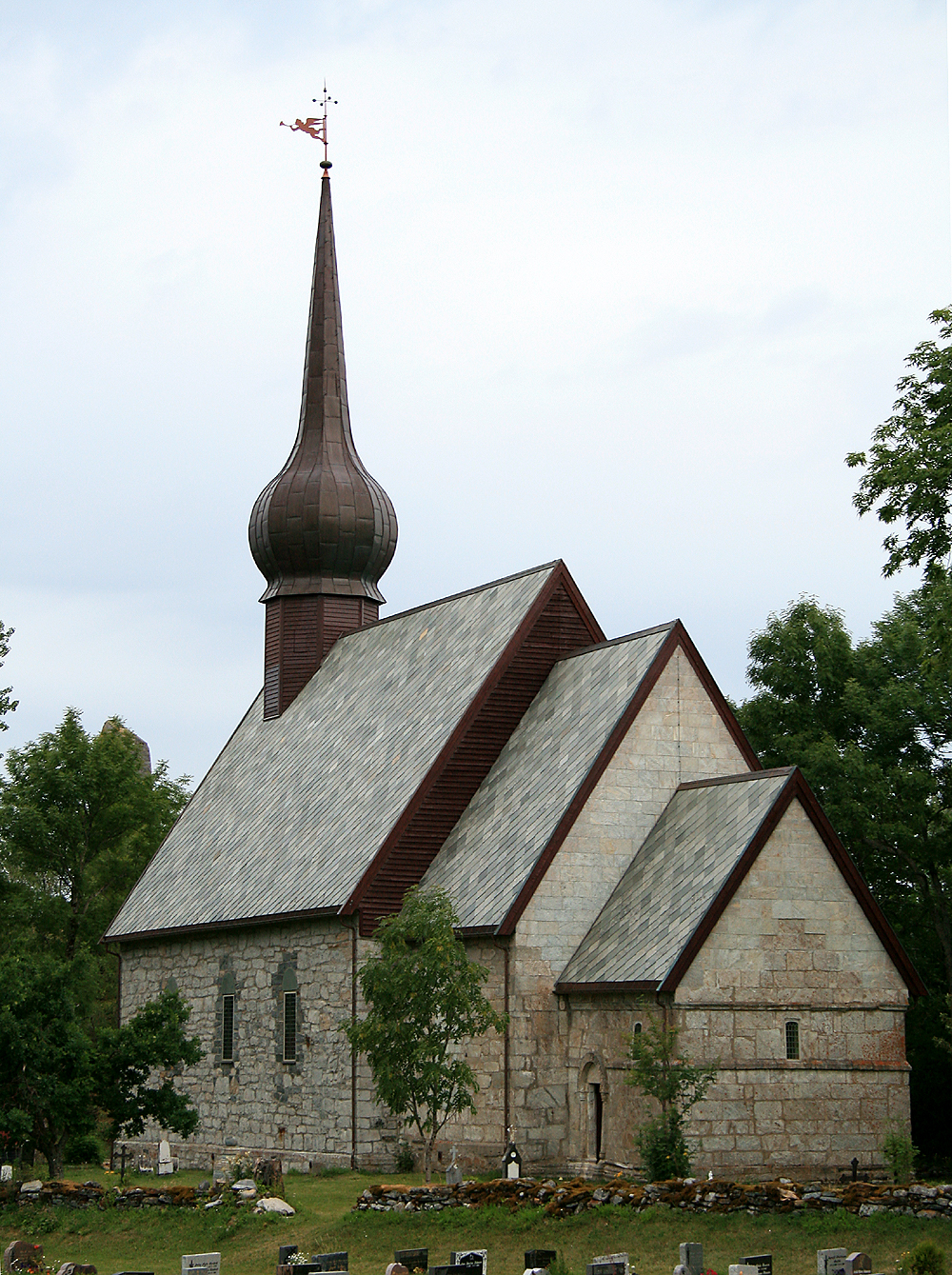
Helgeland Kammerkor recorded their album Folketoner fra Helgeland (Folk music from Helgeland) in Alstahaug Church, one of seven surviving medieval era churches in northern Norway.

| Year of recording | Work / Album | Description | Recorded in |
|---|---|---|---|
| 2005 | Folketoner fra Helgeland (Folk music from Helgeland) | 27 folk tunes from the district of Helgeland in Northern Norway, recorded in collaboration with folk musicians from Helgeland. | Alstahaug Church |
| 2012 | Mennesket og skaperverket (Man and Creation) | Hymns, songs, madrigals and folk music. The title is taken from a hymn by the Norwegian hymn writer Svein Ellingsen. | Gruben Church, Mo i Rana |
