= Storforsheia =

Village in Rana Municipality, Norway

Storforsheia Storforshei (historic spelling)
- Village
- Interactive map of Storforsheia
- Location within Nordland Location within Norway
- Coordinates: 66.4048°N 14.5286°E
- Country: Norway
- Region: Northern Norway
- County: Nordland
- District: Helgeland
- Municipality: Rana Municipality

Area
  - Total: 0.76 km^{2} (0.29 sq mi)
- Elevation: 106 m (348 ft)

Population (2023)
  - Total: 592
  - Density: 779/km^{2} (2,020/sq mi)
- Time zone: UTC+01:00 (CET)
  - Summer (DST): UTC+02:00 (CEST)
- Post Code: 8630 Storforshei

Storforsheia is a village in Rana Municipality in Nordland county, Norway. The village is located in the Dunderland Valley, along the river Ranelva, about 25 kilometres (16 mi) northeast of the town of Mo i Rana. The European route E06 and the Nordland Line both pass through the village. The village of Nevernes and the Nevernes Church both lie about 3 kilometres (1.9 mi) to the south.

The 0.76-square-kilometre (190-acre) village has a population (2023) of 592 and a population density of 779 inhabitants per square kilometre (2,020/sq mi).
