= Røssvoll Church =

Church in Nordland, Norway

- Røssvoll kirke
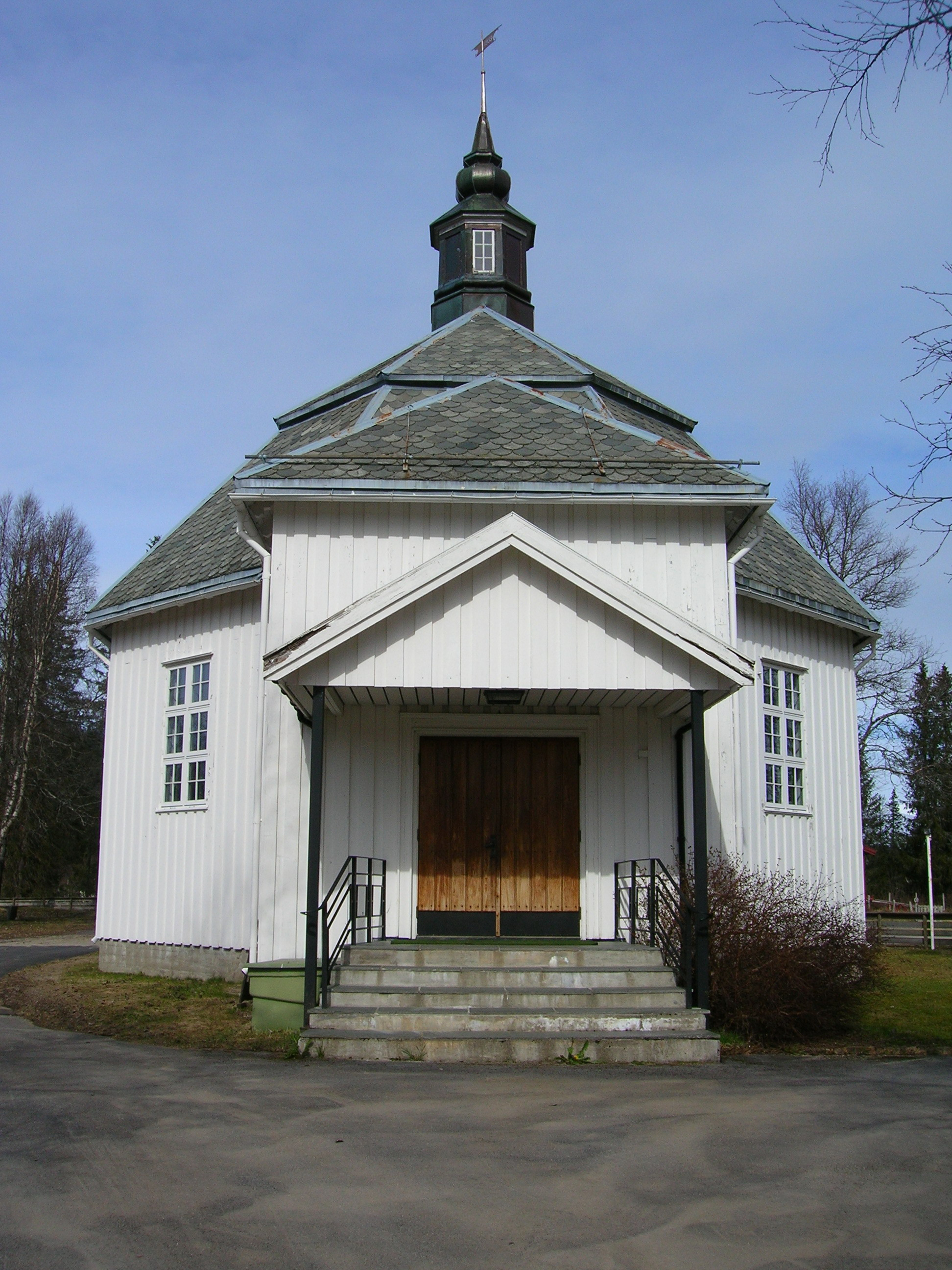
- View of the church
- Røssvoll Church
- 66.3585994°N 14.32355484°E
- Location: Rana Municipality, Nordland
- Country: Norway
- Denomination: Church of Norway
- Churchmanship: Evangelical Lutheran

History
- Status: Parish church
- Founded: 1952
- Consecrated: 1952

Architecture
- Functional status: Active
- Architect(s): A. Nygård and Skyberg
- Architectural type: Long church
- Completed: 1952 (74 years ago)

Specifications
- Capacity: 250
- Materials: Wood

Administration
- Diocese: Sør-Hålogaland
- Deanery: Indre Helgeland prosti
- Parish: Røssvoll
- Norwegian Cultural Heritage Site
- Type: Church
- Status: Not protected
- ID: 85345

Røssvoll Church (Norwegian: Røssvoll kirke) is a parish church of the Church of Norway in Rana Municipality in Nordland county, Norway. It is located in the village of Røssvoll. It is the church for the Røssvoll parish which is part of the Indre Helgeland prosti (deanery) in the Diocese of Sør-Hålogaland. The white, wooden church was built in an octagonal style in 1952 using plans drawn up by the architects A. Nygård and Skyberg. The church seats about 250 people. The church was built with a donation from Anne Marie Bosse, which is why it is sometimes referred to as the Anne Marie Church.

Helgeland Kammerkor gave a Spring concert in Røssvoll Church in 2013.

== Media gallery ==
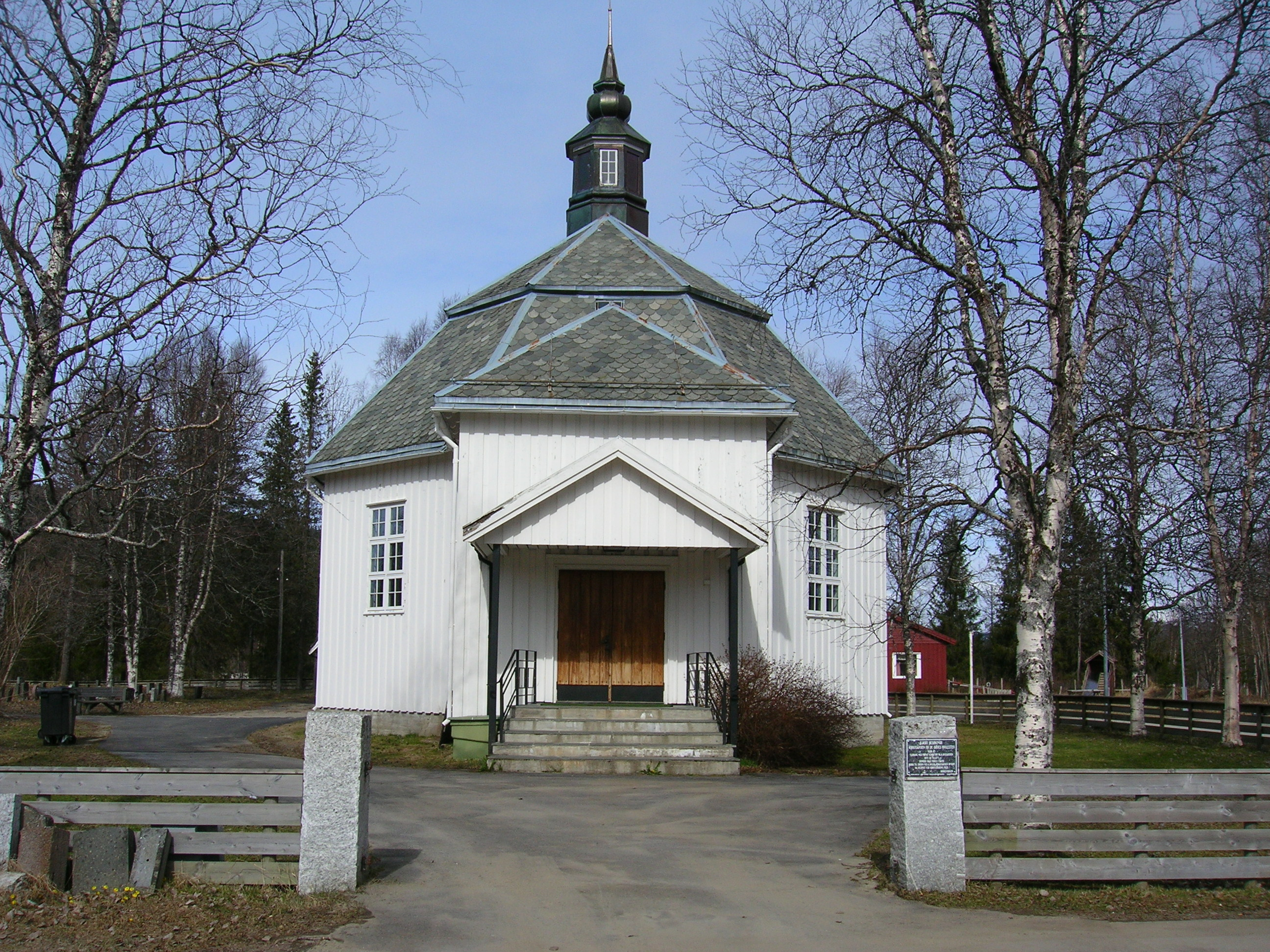

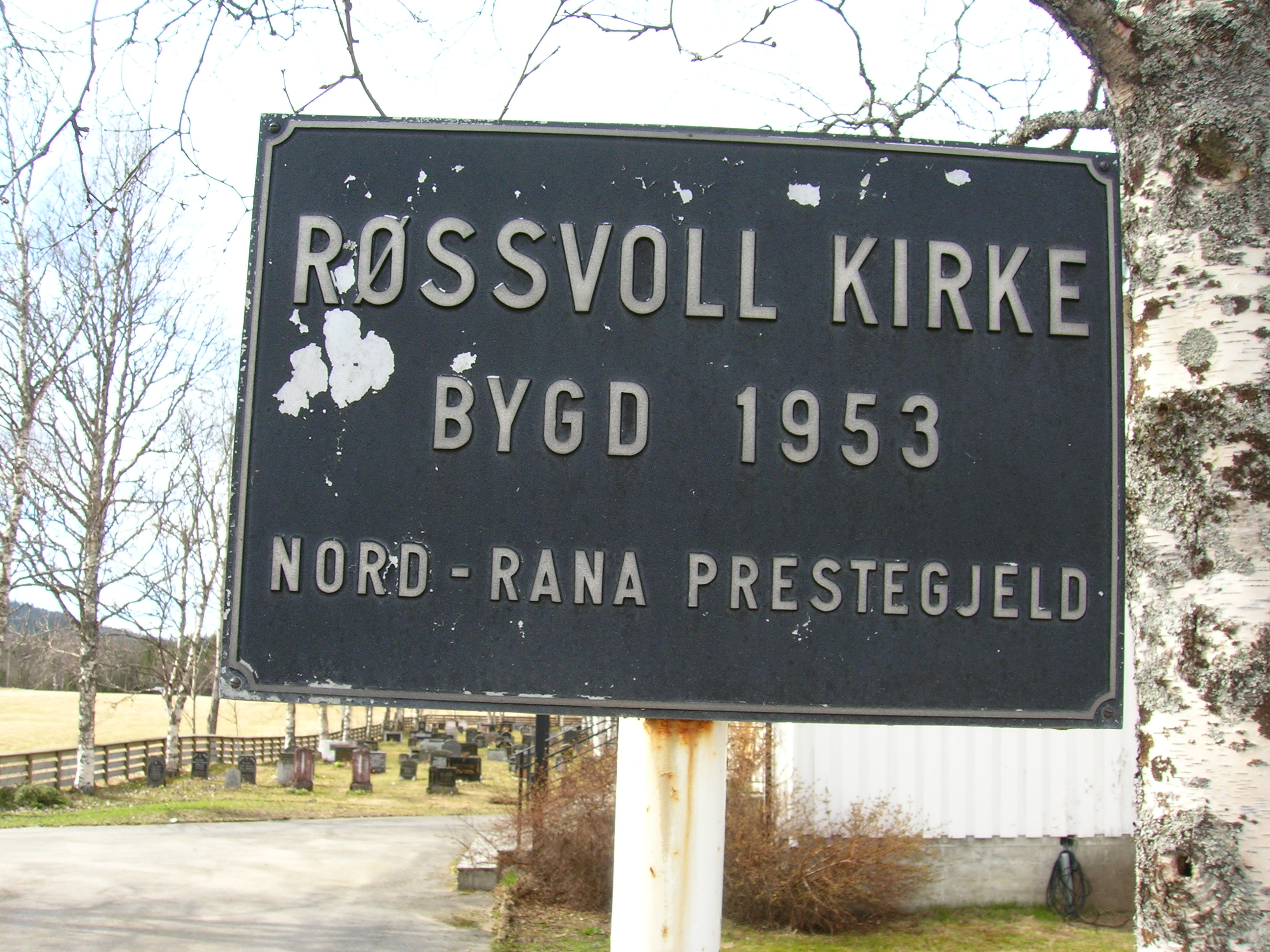

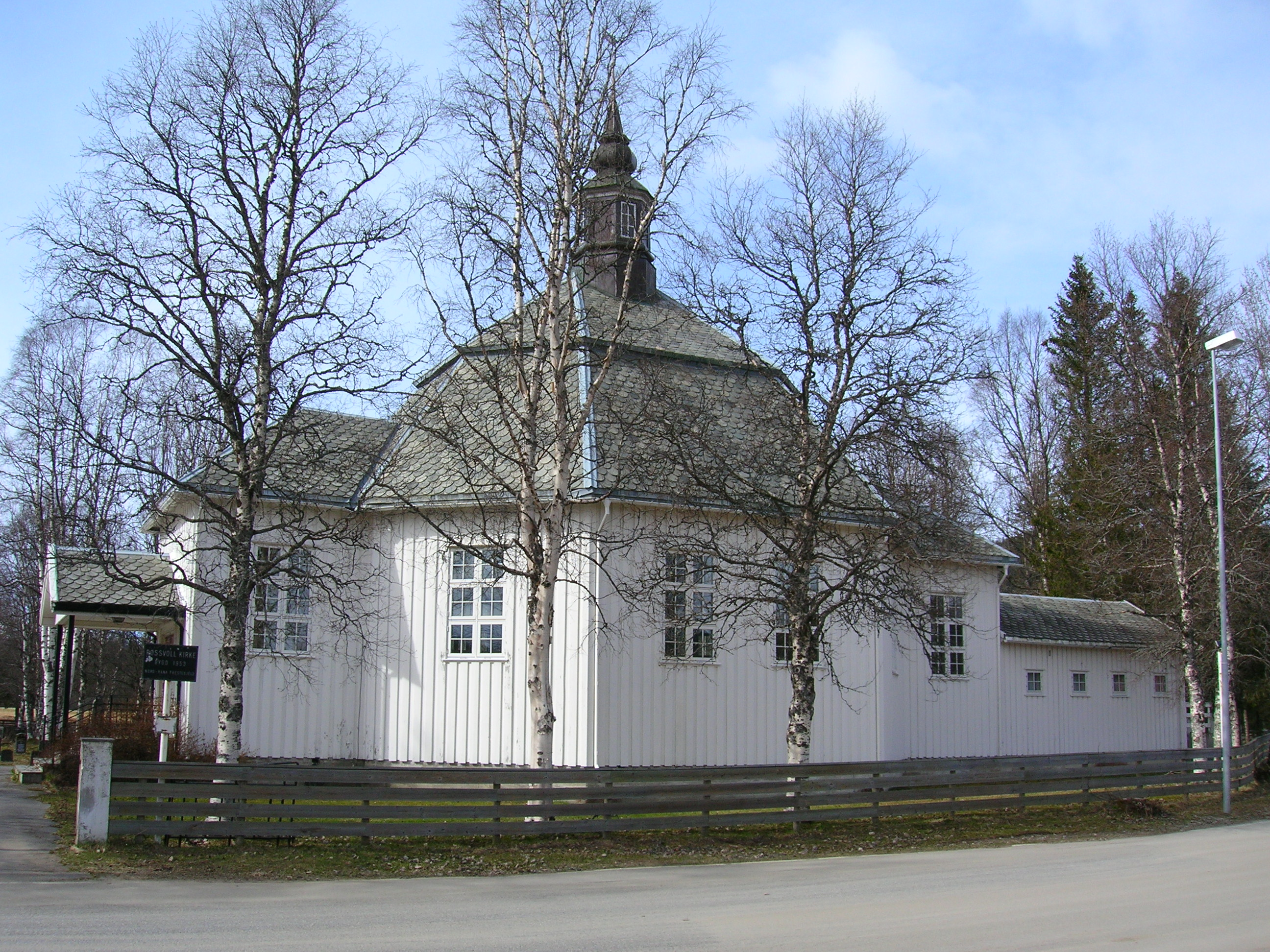

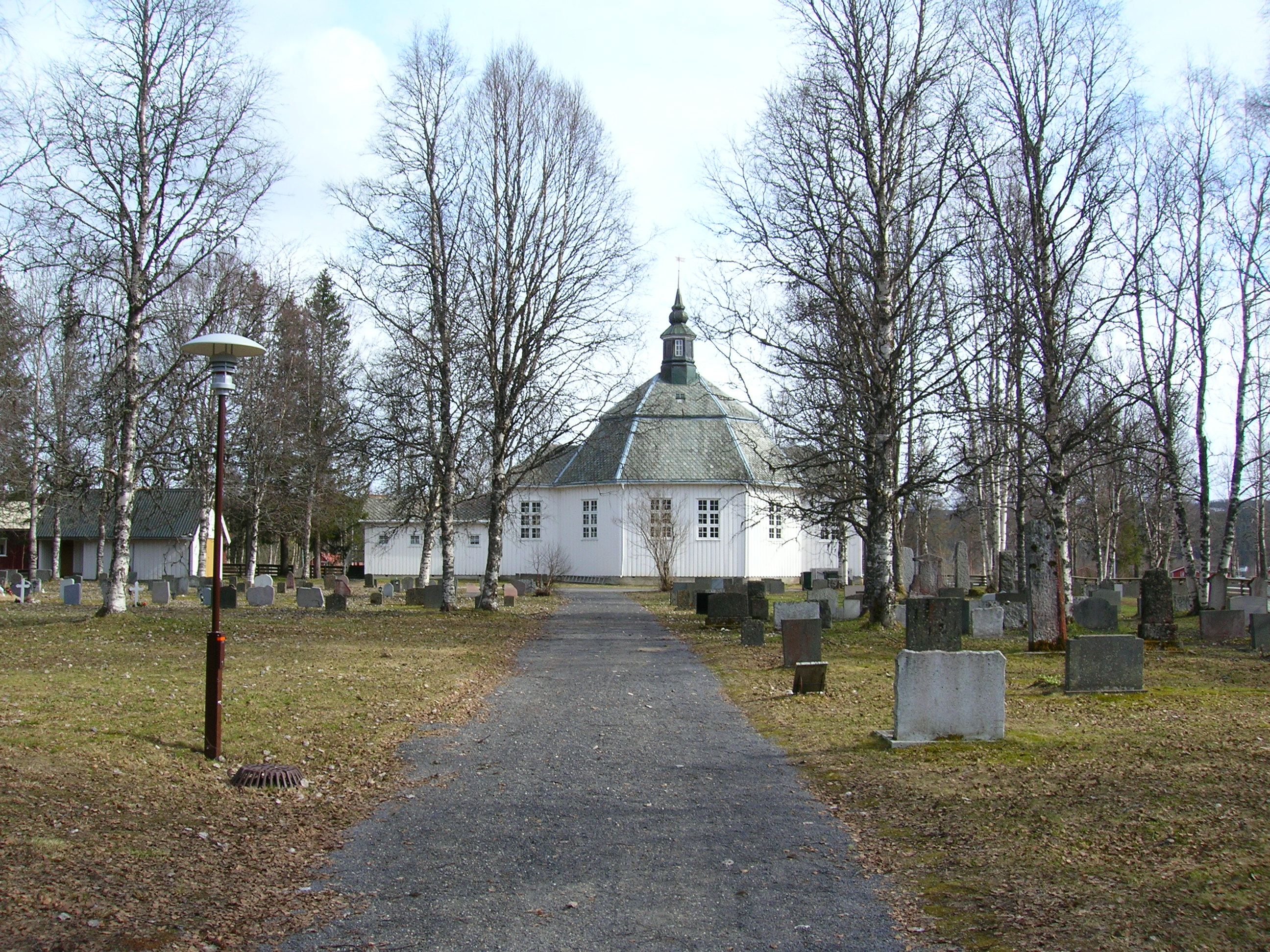

== See also ==
- List of churches in Sør-Hålogaland
