= Nevernes =

Village in Rana Municipality, Norway

- Village
- Interactive map of Nevernes
- Location within Nordland Location within Norway
- Coordinates: 66.3811°N 14.5722°E
- Country: Norway
- Region: Northern Norway
- County: Nordland
- District: Helgeland
- Municipality: Rana Municipality
- Elevation: 68 m (223 ft)
- Time zone: UTC+01:00 (CET)
  - Summer (DST): UTC+02:00 (CEST)
- Post Code: 8630 Storforshei

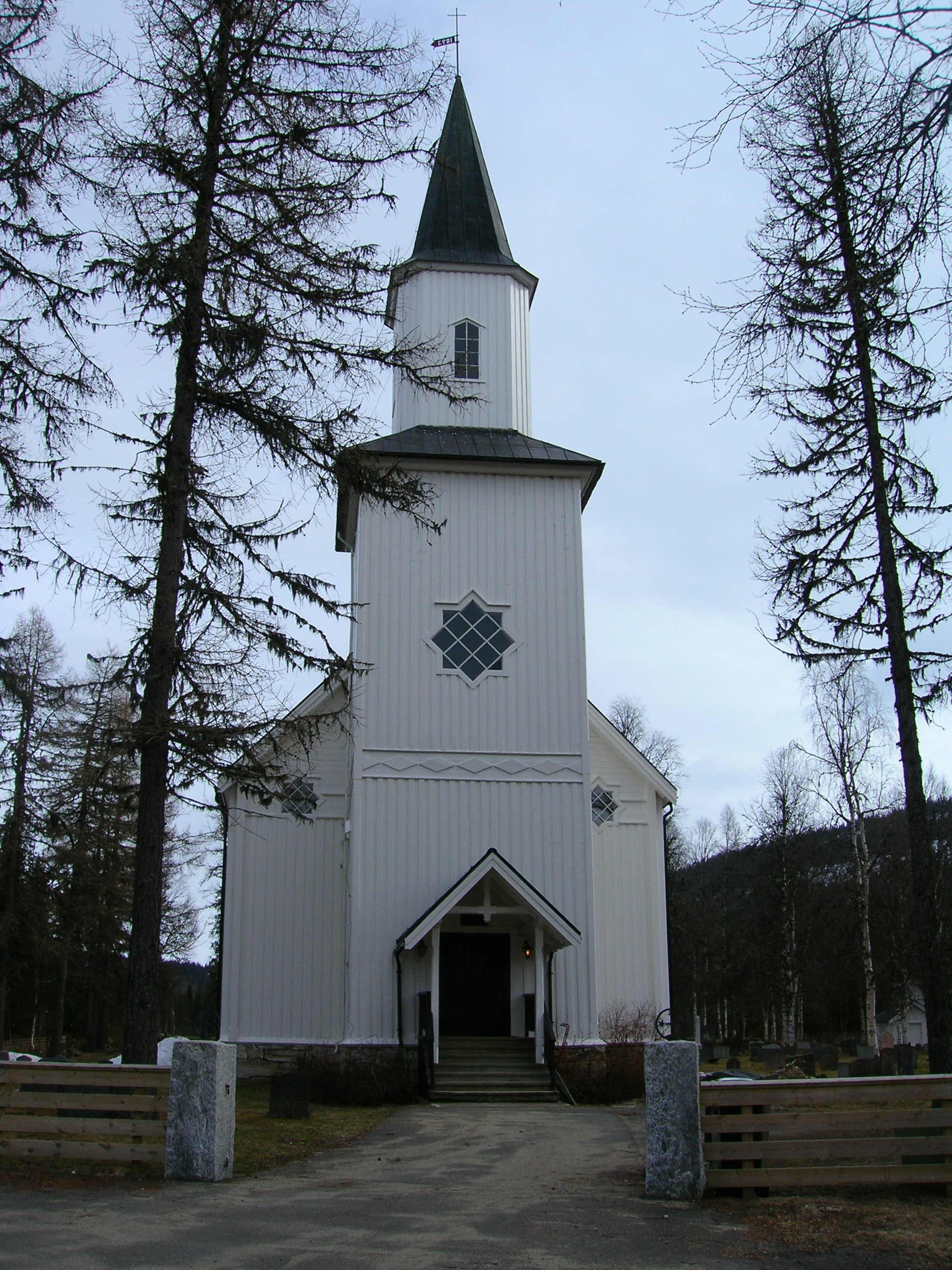
Nevernes church, Rana municipality, Nordland, Norway

Nevernes is a village in Rana Municipality in Nordland county, Norway. The rural village is located about 30 kilometres (19 mi) northeast of the town of Mo i Rana. The village is located in the Dunderland Valley along the river Ranelva, about 5 kilometres (3.1 mi) southeast of the village of Storforsheia. European route E06 and the Nordland Line both pass through the village. Nevernes Church is located in this village.
