= Andreas Grenstad =

Norwegian architect

Andreas Nilsen Grenstad
- Born: 1821; Klæbu, Norway
- Died: 1895 (aged 73–74); Vefsen, Norway
- Occupation: Architect
- Spouse: Karen Marie Jørgensdatter
- Parent(s): Nils Olsen Grendstad; Agneta Larsdatter Moen

Andreas Nilsen Grenstad (1821-1895) was a Norwegian architect who was best known for the churches that he designed. His nickname was Anders Kirkebygger (Andreas the church-builder).

Grenstad was born on the Grendstad farm in what was Klæbu Municipality in Søndre Trøndhjems county in 1821. As an adult, he lived mostly in and around Mosjøen in Vefsn Municipality.

During the second half of the 19th century, Grenstad established himself as an architect and builder. His sons helped him with his business as well. The family had a sawmill as well as a boat building side business. They would often use the boats they built to go fishing in the Lofoten area. In 1860, he was one of the founders of a bank in Mosjøen. For a time around 1865, Grenstad was also a local politician who fought for farmers' rights.

In 1951 during the restoration work of Valberg Church, a letter was found under the floor that was written by Grenstad. It read: "This church is built by Andreas Grenstad from Vefsn, Mosjøen, in the year of 1888, when it also was finished. Two of his sons participated in the work. This is the 8th church built by me, in addition to 7 others I have contributed to. Fifteen churches in my time in total. Now I will be 67 years old later this month. Andreas Grenstad is born on the farm Grenstad in Klæbu."

== Name ==
Spellings in 19th century Norway were not formalized and historical records can vary with spellings of his name. His last name may vary between Grenstad, Grendestad, Grendstad, or Grinstad. His first name varies as well with spellings of Andreas, Anders, or Nils (a short form of his patronymic name).

== Works ==
Grenstad is known to have designed nine churches in northern Norway:

- Grane Church (1860)
- Mo Church (1860)
- Korgen Church (1863)
- Vevelstad Church (1871)
- Stamnæs Church (1881)
- Drevja Church (1883)
- Rødøy Church (1885)
- Valberg Church (1889)
- Nevernes Church (1893)
