= Drevja Church =

Church in Nordland, Norway

- Drevja kirke
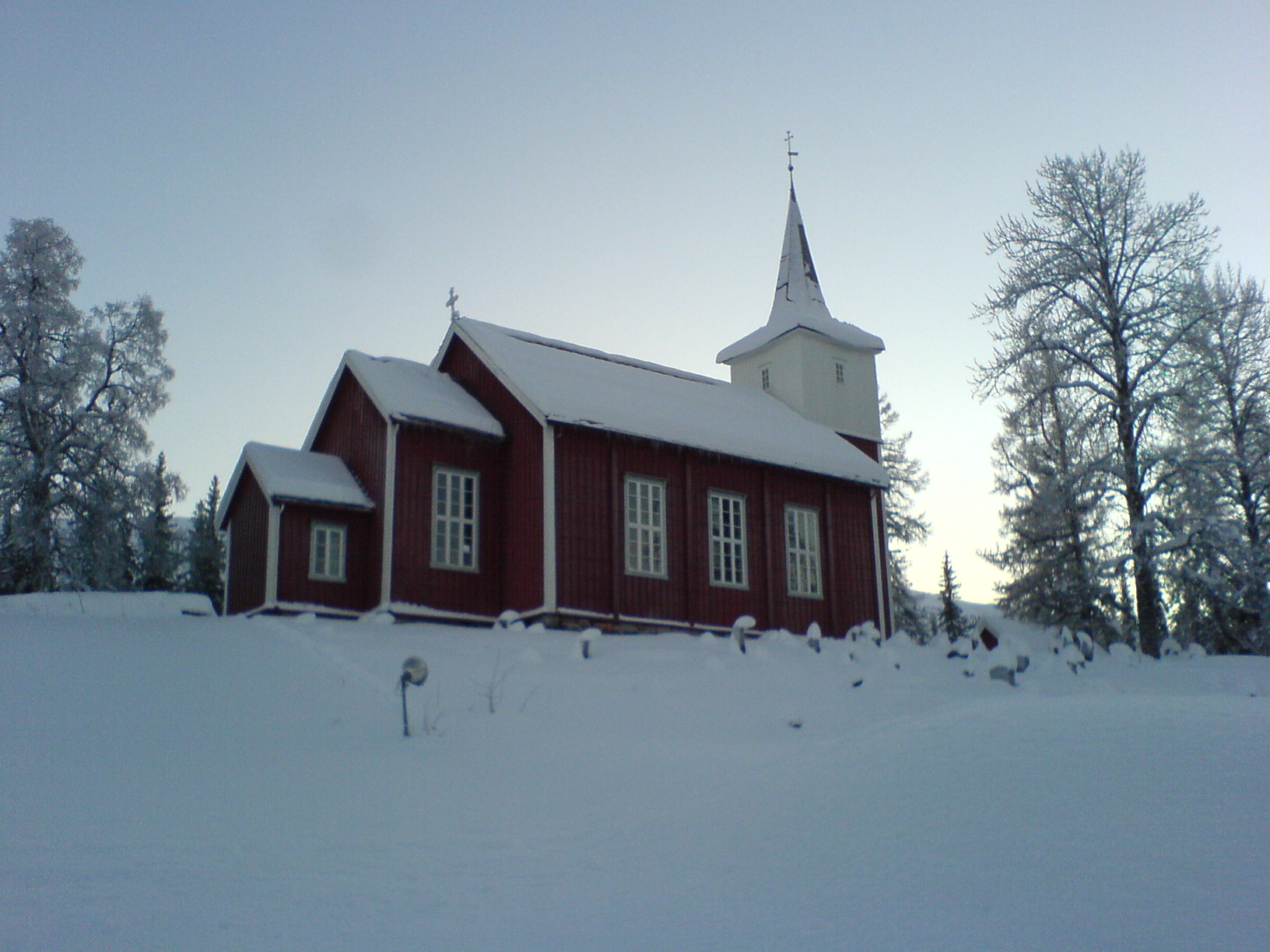
- View of the church
- Drevja Church
- 65.98261391°N 13.2654359°E
- Location: Vefsn Municipality, Nordland
- Country: Norway
- Denomination: Church of Norway
- Churchmanship: Evangelical Lutheran

History
- Status: Parish church
- Founded: 1883
- Consecrated: 28 September 1883

Architecture
- Functional status: Active
- Architect(s): Andreas Grenstad and Torolf Prytz
- Architectural type: Long church
- Completed: 1883 (143 years ago)

Specifications
- Capacity: 200
- Materials: Wood

Administration
- Diocese: Sør-Hålogaland
- Deanery: Indre Helgeland prosti
- Parish: Drevja
- Norwegian Cultural Heritage Site
- Type: Church
- Status: Listed
- ID: 84035

Drevja Church (Norwegian: Drevja kirke) is a parish church of the Church of Norway in Vefsn Municipality in Nordland county, Norway. It is located at Nilsskogen in the Drevjedalen area of northern Vefsn Municipality. It is the church for the Drevja parish which is part of the Indre Helgeland prosti (deanery) in the Diocese of Sør-Hålogaland. The red, wooden church was built in a long church style in 1883 by the architects Andreas Grenstad and Torolf Prytz. The church seats about 200 people. The church was consecrated on 28 September 1883.

== See also ==
- List of churches in Sør-Hålogaland
