= Sjona Church =

Church in Nordland, Norway

- Sjona kirke
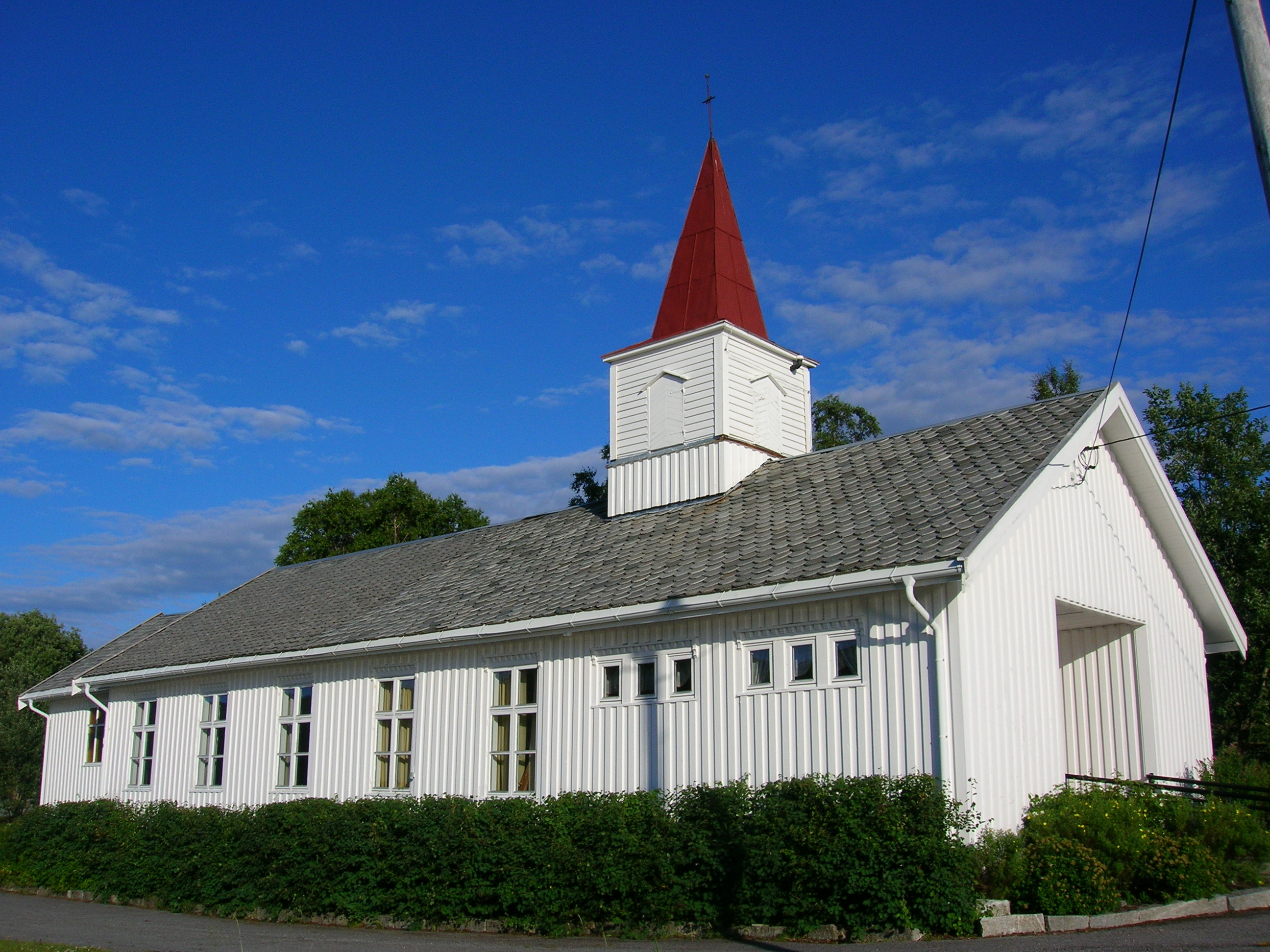
- View of the church
- Sjona Church
- 66.3019521°N 13.4786447°E
- Location: Rana Municipality, Nordland
- Country: Norway
- Denomination: Church of Norway
- Churchmanship: Evangelical Lutheran

History
- Former name: Sjona bedehuskapell
- Status: Parish church
- Founded: 1896
- Consecrated: 1916

Architecture
- Functional status: Active
- Architectural type: Long church
- Completed: 1896 (130 years ago)

Specifications
- Capacity: 170
- Materials: Wood

Administration
- Diocese: Sør-Hålogaland
- Deanery: Indre Helgeland prosti
- Parish: Sjona
- Norwegian Cultural Heritage Site
- Type: Church
- Status: Not protected
- ID: 85437

Sjona Church (Norwegian: Sjona kirke) is a parish church of the Church of Norway in Rana Municipality in Nordland county, Norway. It is located in the village of Myklebustad. It is the church for the Sjona parish which is part of the Indre Helgeland prosti (deanery) in the Diocese of Sør-Hålogaland. The white, wooden church was built in a long church style in 1896 using plans drawn up by an unknown architect. The church seats about 170 people.

== History ==
The building was first constructed in 1896 to serve as a local prayer house. In 1916, the church was consecrated as an annex chapel. In 2003, the chapel was upgraded to full parish church status.

== Media gallery ==
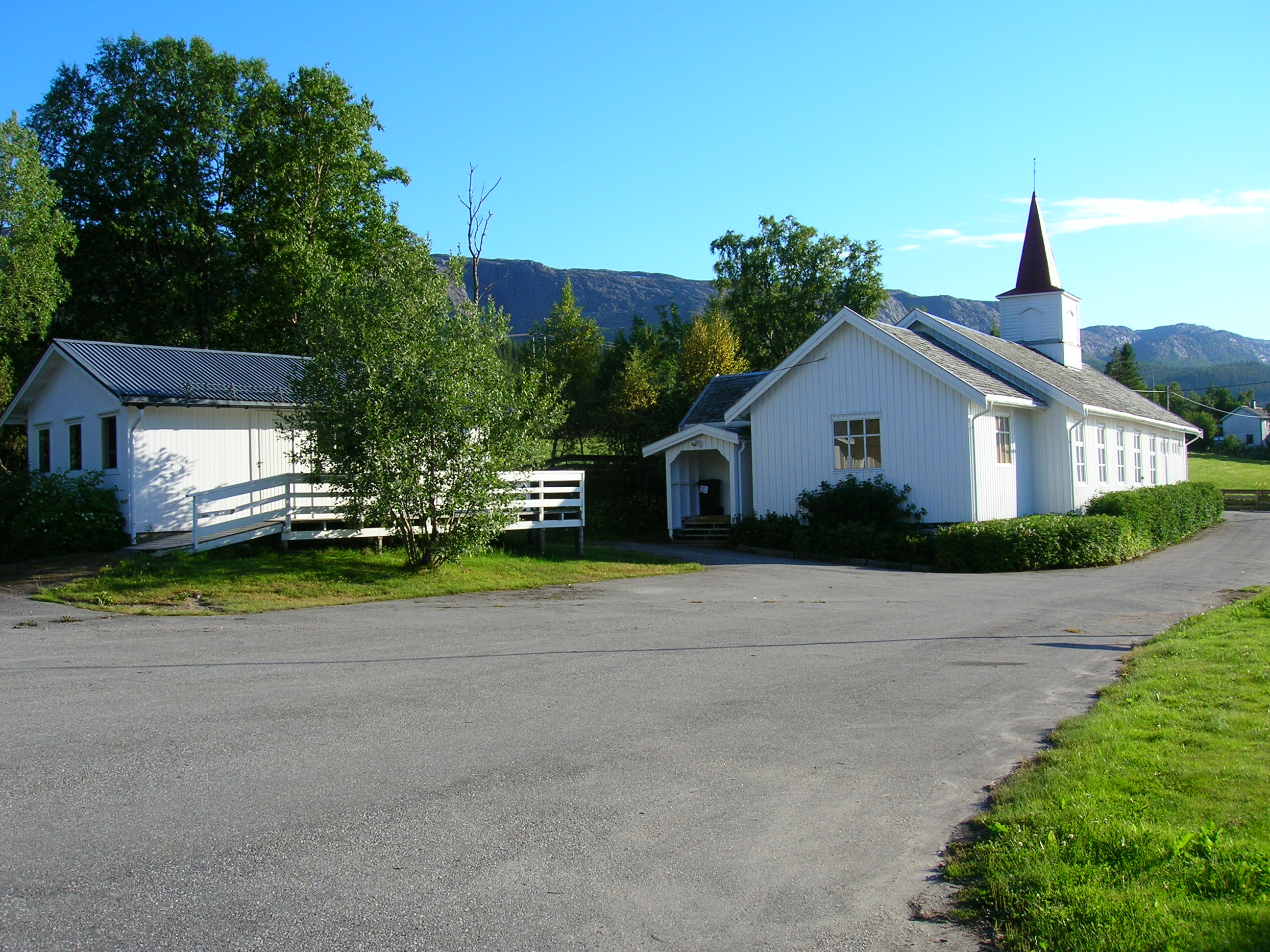

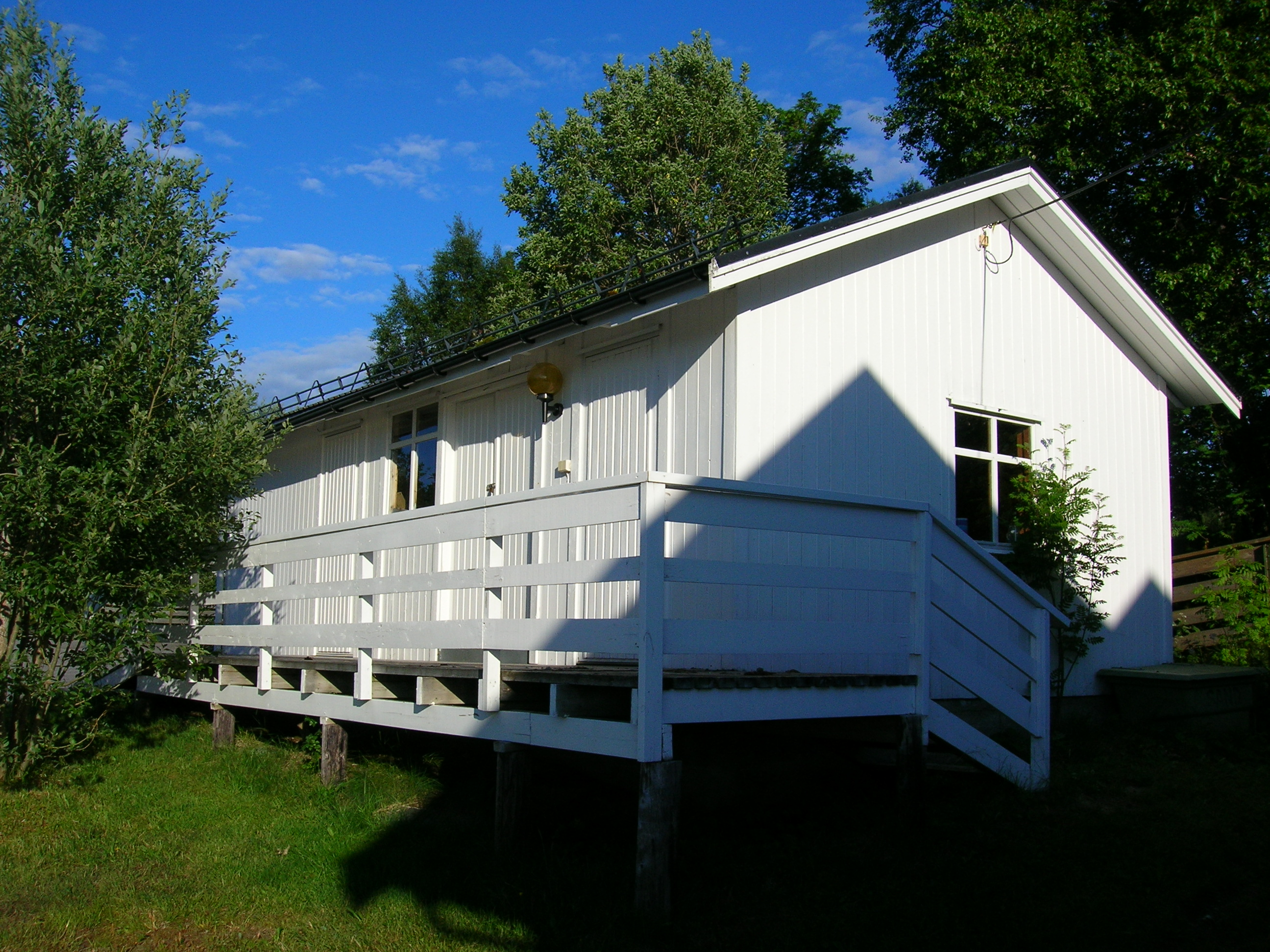

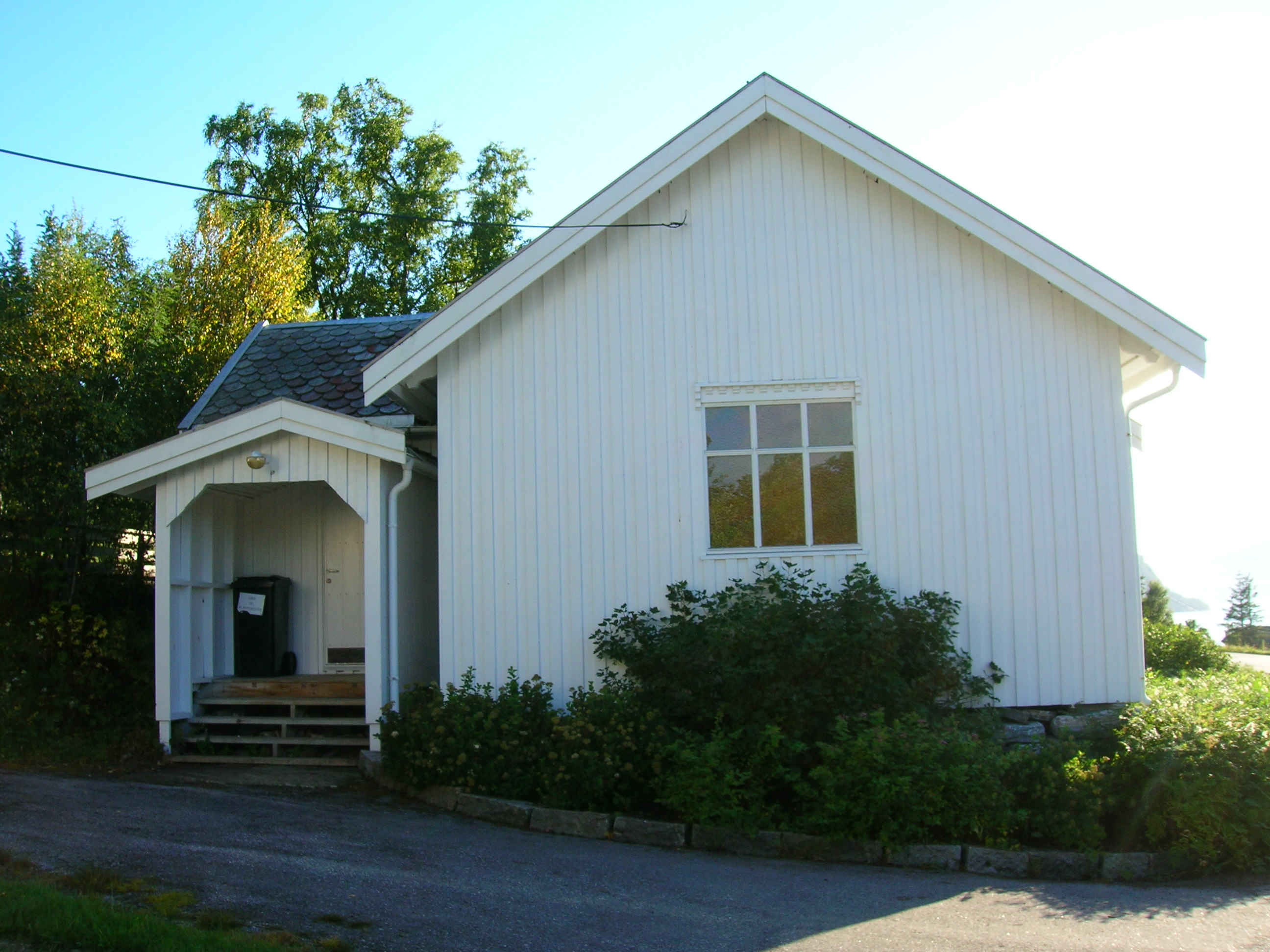

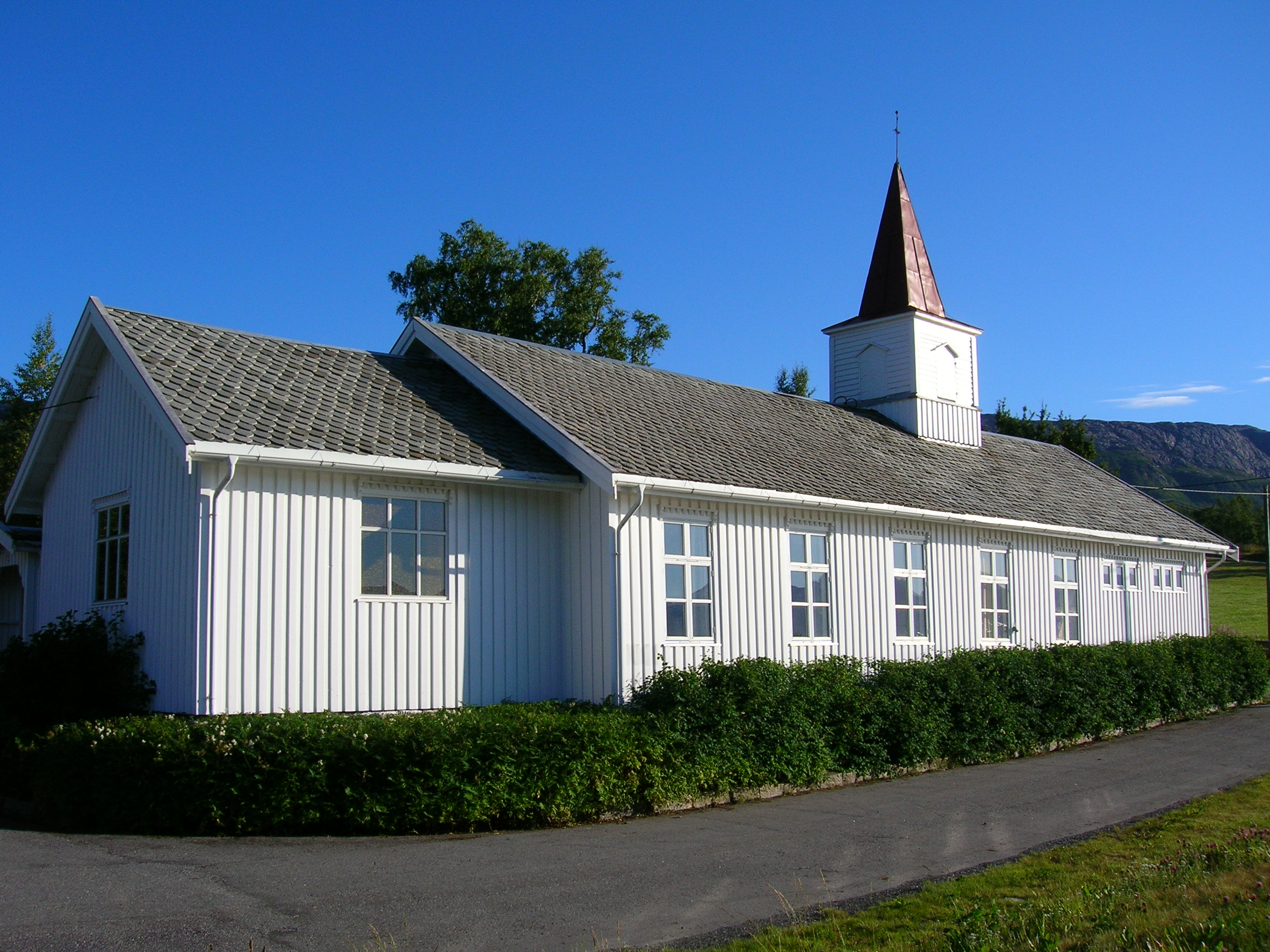

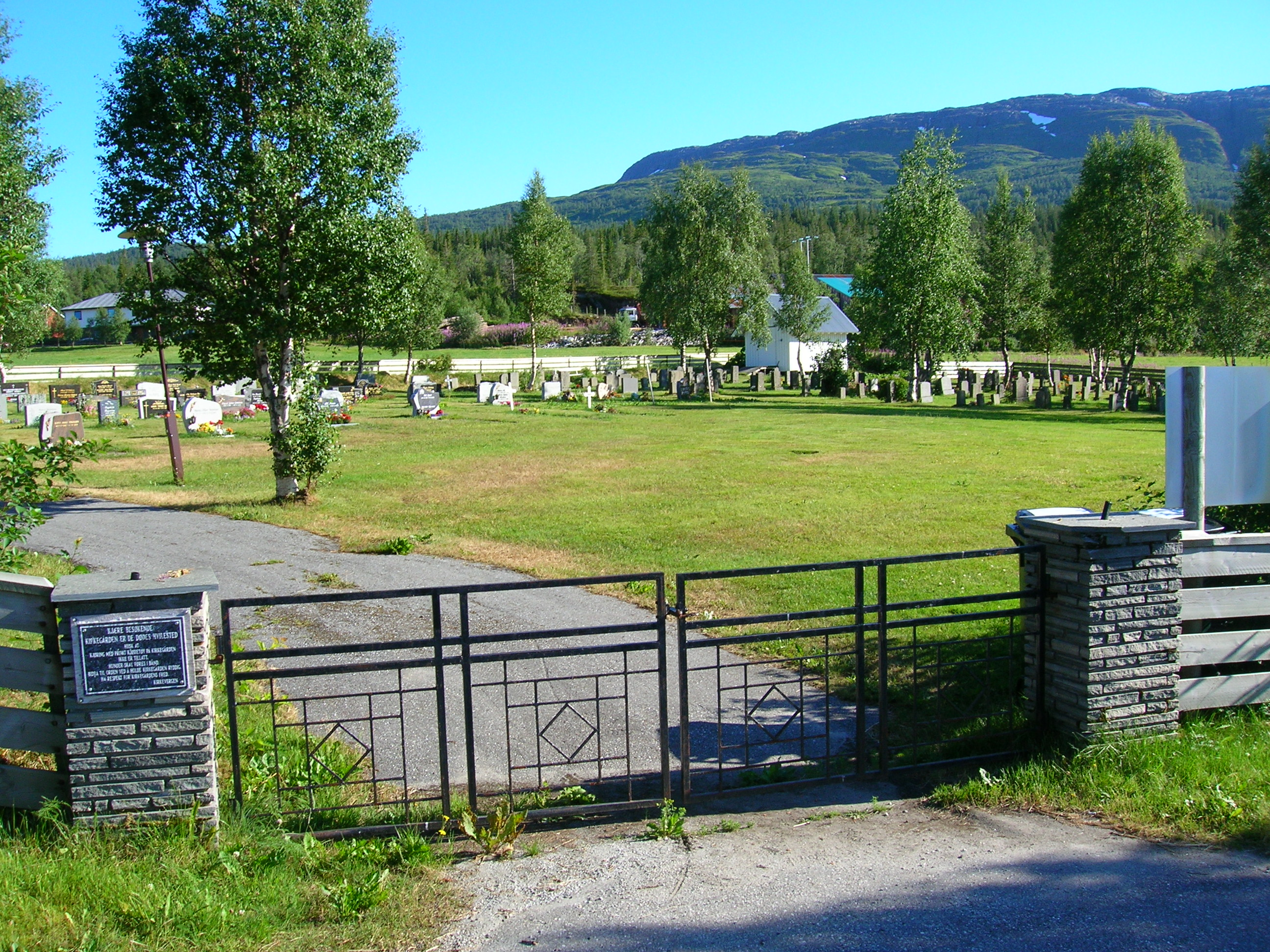

== See also ==
- List of churches in Sør-Hålogaland
