= Korgen Church =

Church in Nordland, Norway

- Korgen kirke
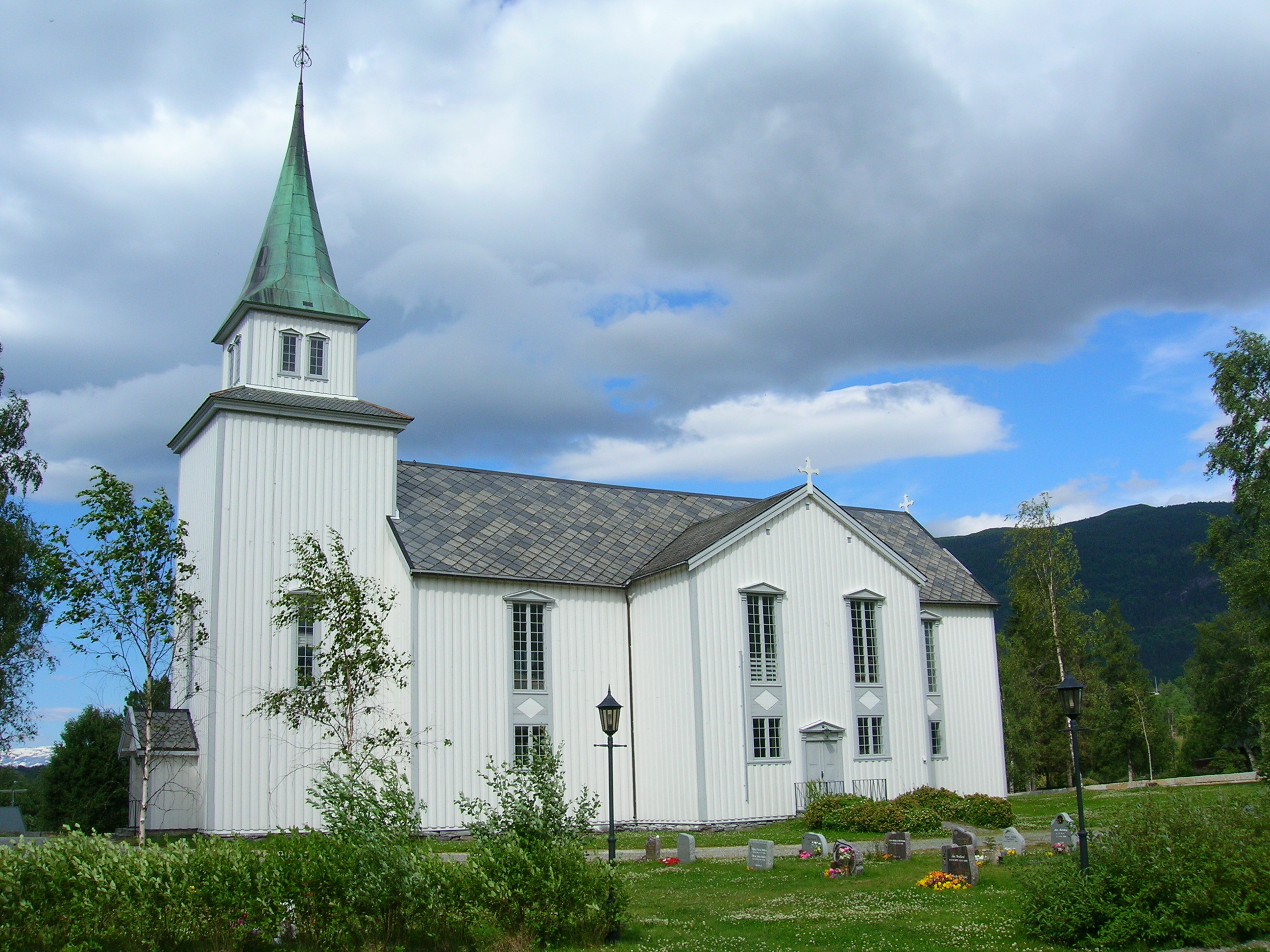
- View of the church
- Korgen Church
- 66.0765985°N 13.8253915°E
- Location: Hemnes Municipality, Nordland
- Country: Norway
- Denomination: Church of Norway
- Churchmanship: Evangelical Lutheran

History
- Status: Parish church
- Founded: 1863
- Consecrated: 1863

Architecture
- Functional status: Active
- Architect: Andreas Grenstad
- Architectural type: Cruciform
- Completed: 1863 (163 years ago)

Specifications
- Capacity: 450
- Materials: Wood

Administration
- Diocese: Sør-Hålogaland
- Deanery: Indre Helgeland prosti
- Parish: Korgen
- Norwegian Cultural Heritage Site
- Type: Church
- Status: Not protected
- ID: 84821

Korgen Church (Norwegian: Korgen kirke) is a parish church of the Church of Norway in Hemnes Municipality in Nordland county, Norway. It is located in the village of Korgen. It is the church for the Korgen parish which is part of the Indre Helgeland prosti (deanery) in the Diocese of Sør-Hålogaland. The white, wooden church was built in a cruciform style in 1863 using plans drawn up by the architect Andreas Grenstad. The church seats about 450 people.

== Media gallery ==
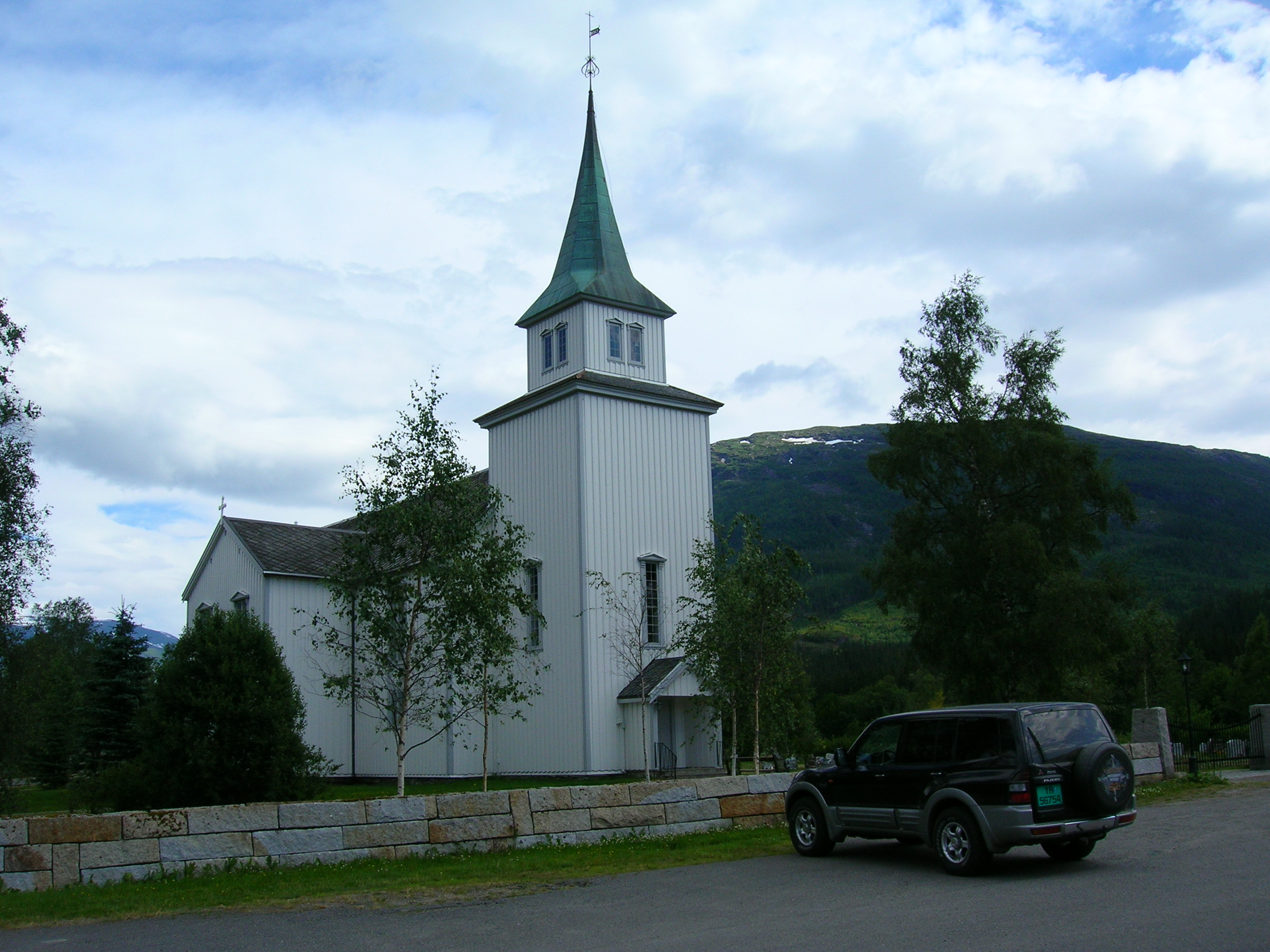

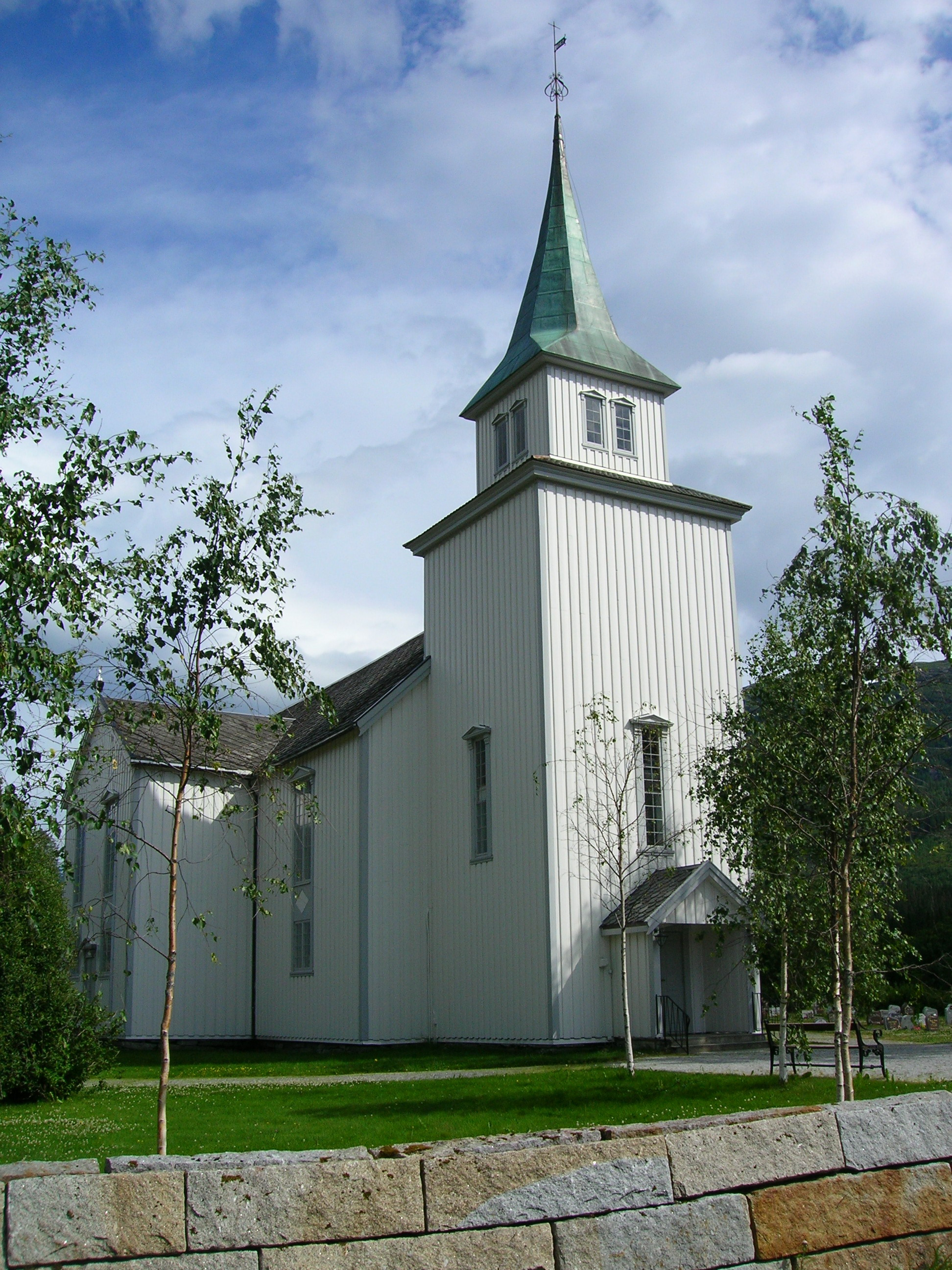

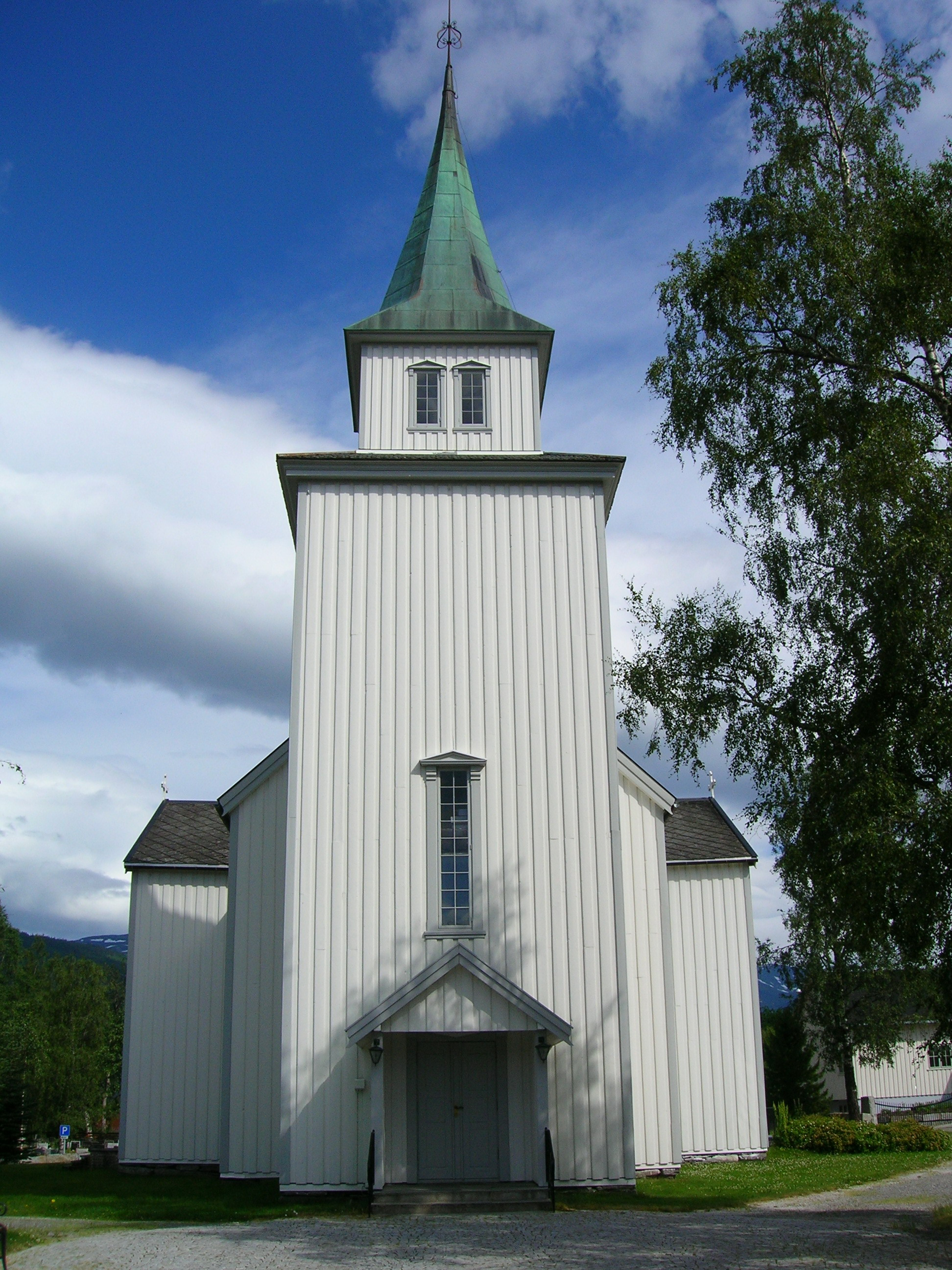

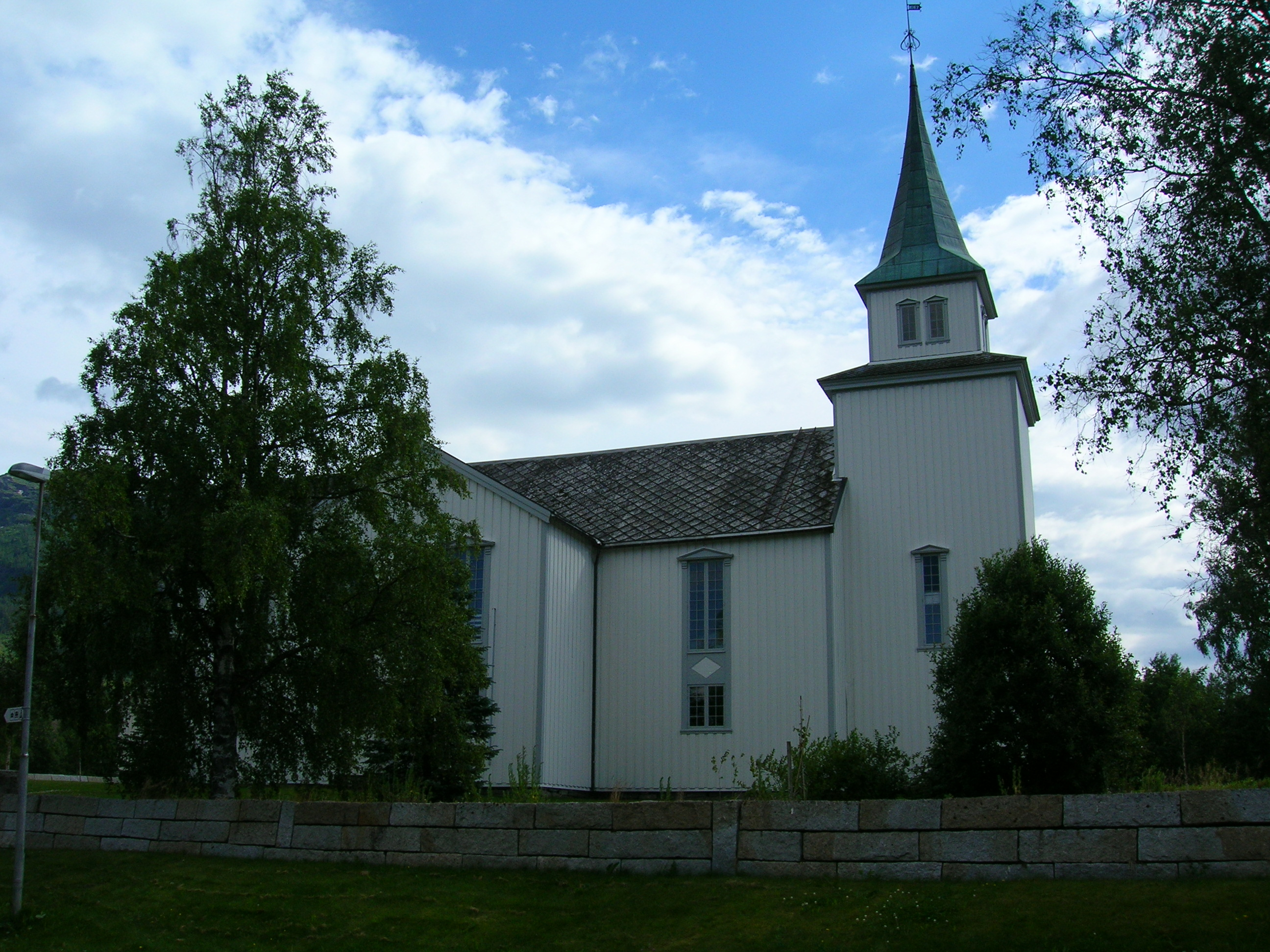

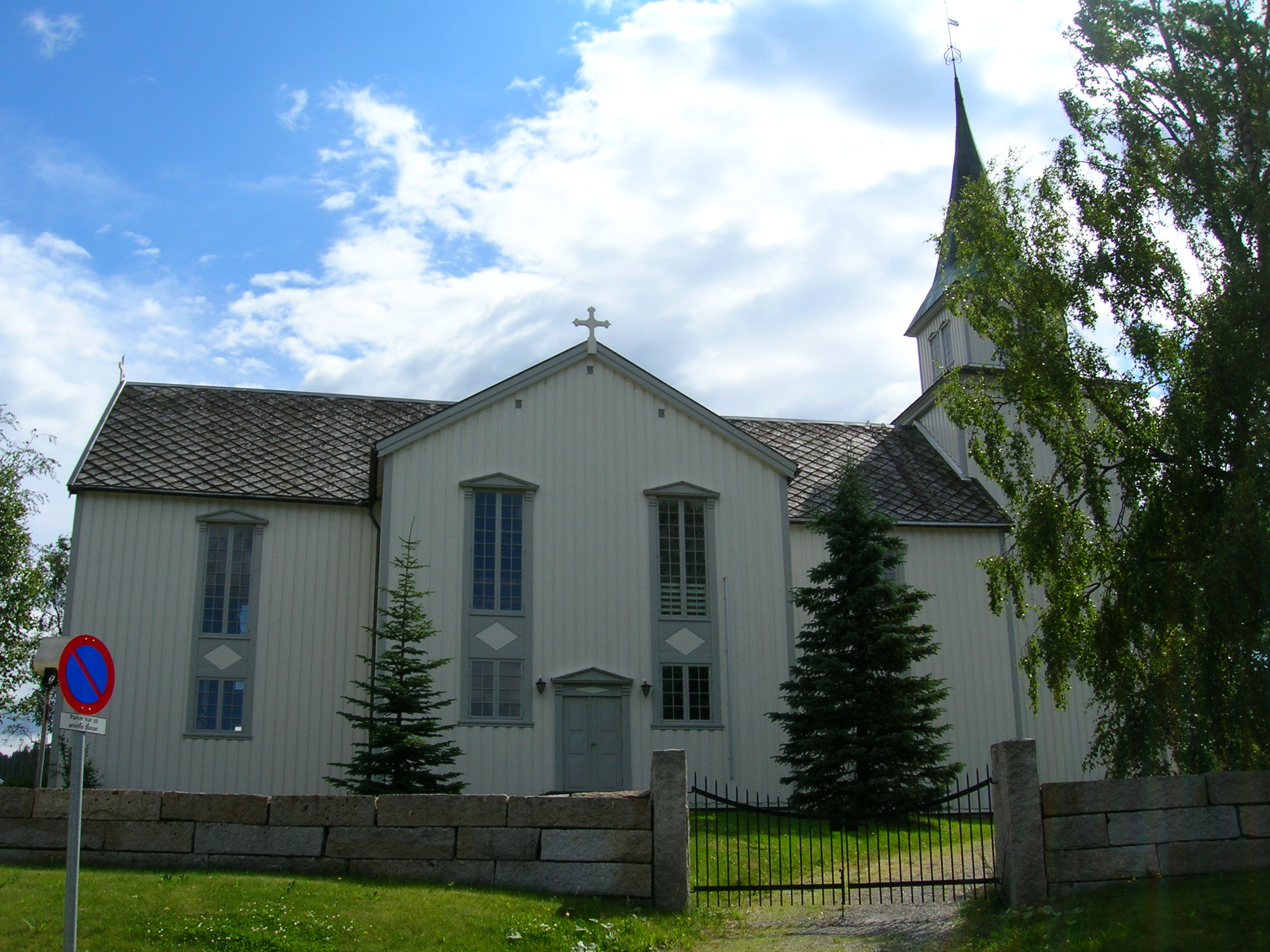

== See also ==
- List of churches in Nordland
