= Nevernes Church =

Church in Nordland, Norway

- Nevernes kirke
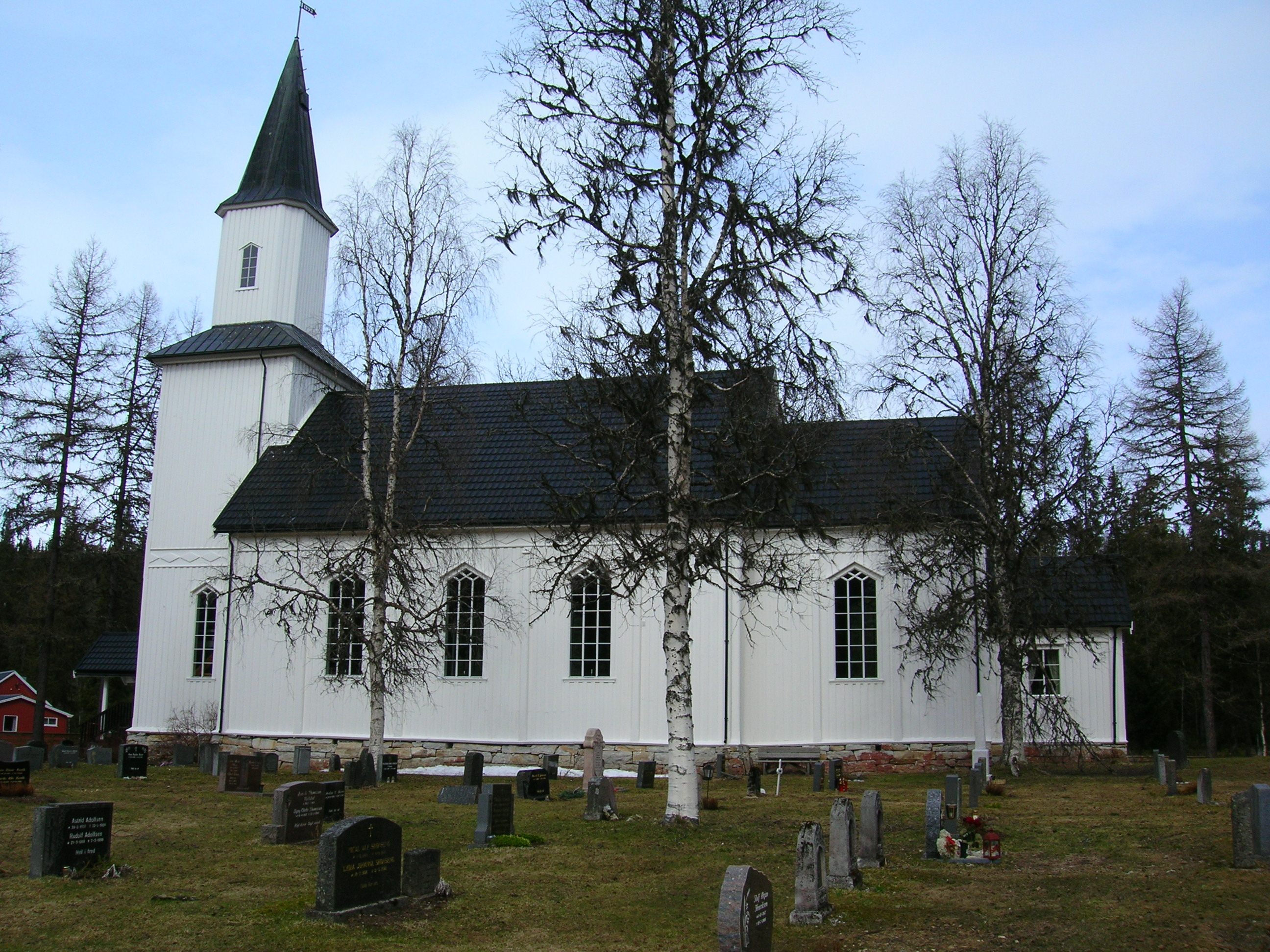
- View of the church
- Nevernes Church
- 66.3779999°N 14.5769959°E
- Location: Rana Municipality, Nordland
- Country: Norway
- Denomination: Church of Norway
- Churchmanship: Evangelical Lutheran

History
- Status: Parish church
- Founded: 1893
- Consecrated: 1893

Architecture
- Functional status: Active
- Architect: Andreas Grenstad
- Architectural type: Long church
- Completed: 1893 (133 years ago)

Specifications
- Capacity: 250
- Materials: Wood

Administration
- Diocese: Sør-Hålogaland
- Deanery: Indre Helgeland prosti
- Parish: Nevernes
- Norwegian Cultural Heritage Site
- Type: Church
- Status: Not protected
- ID: 85128

Nevernes Church (Norwegian: Nevernes kirke) is a parish church of the Church of Norway in Rana Municipality in Nordland county, Norway. It is located in the village of Nevernes. It is the church for the Nevernes parish which is part of the Indre Helgeland prosti (deanery) in the Diocese of Sør-Hålogaland. The white, wooden church was built in a long church style in 1893 using plans drawn up by the architect Andreas Grenstad. The church seats about 250 people.

== Media gallery ==
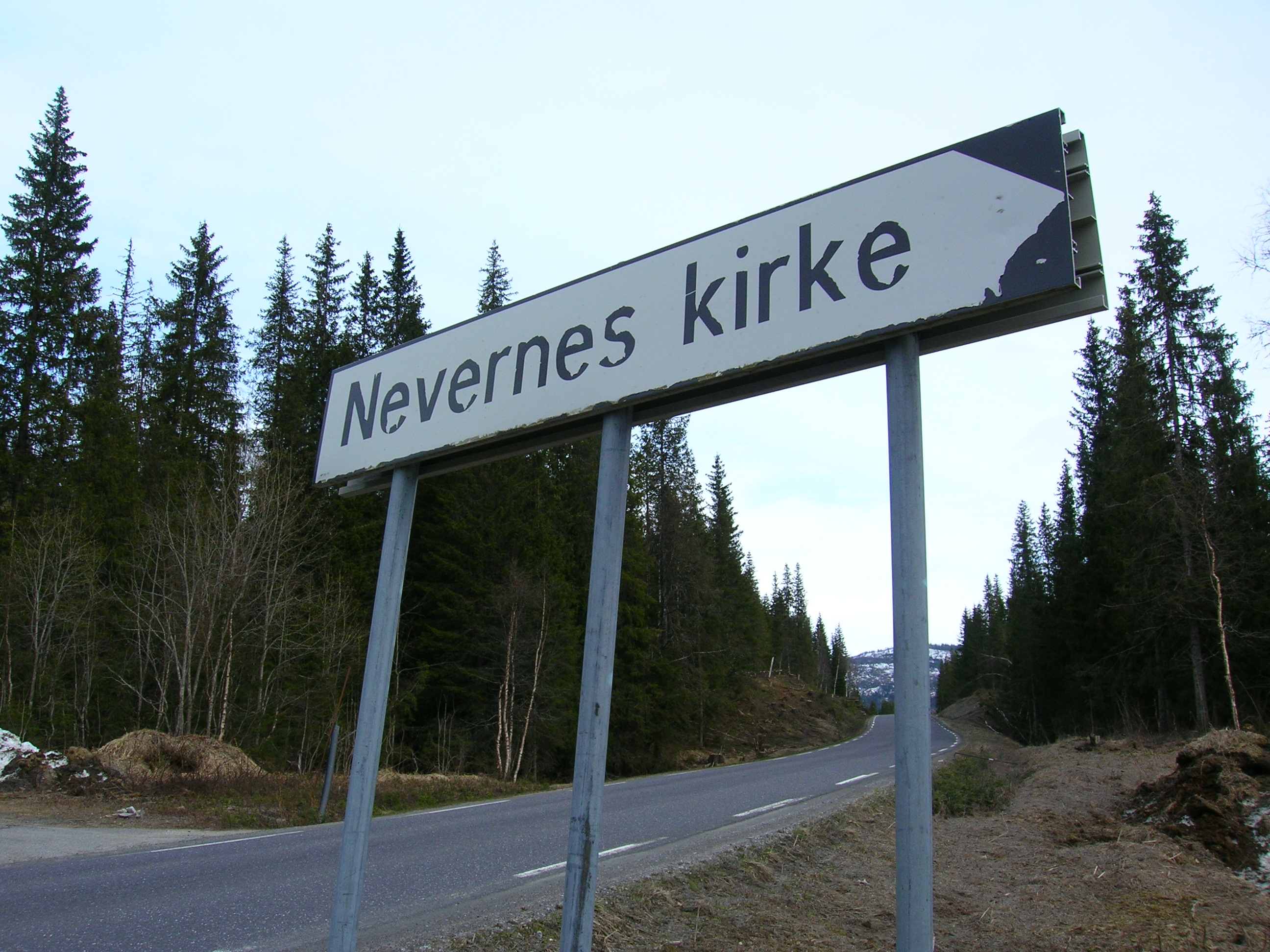

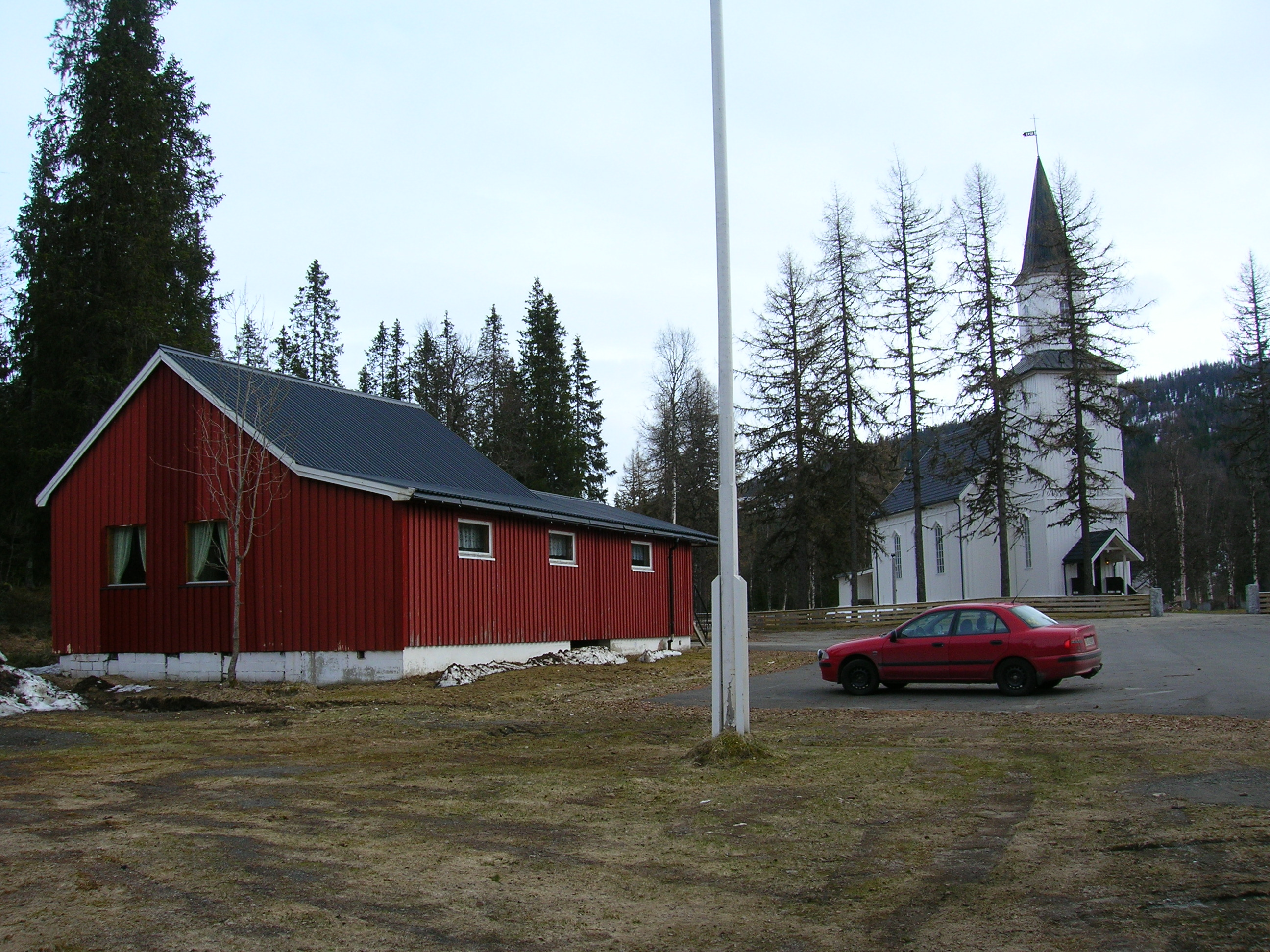

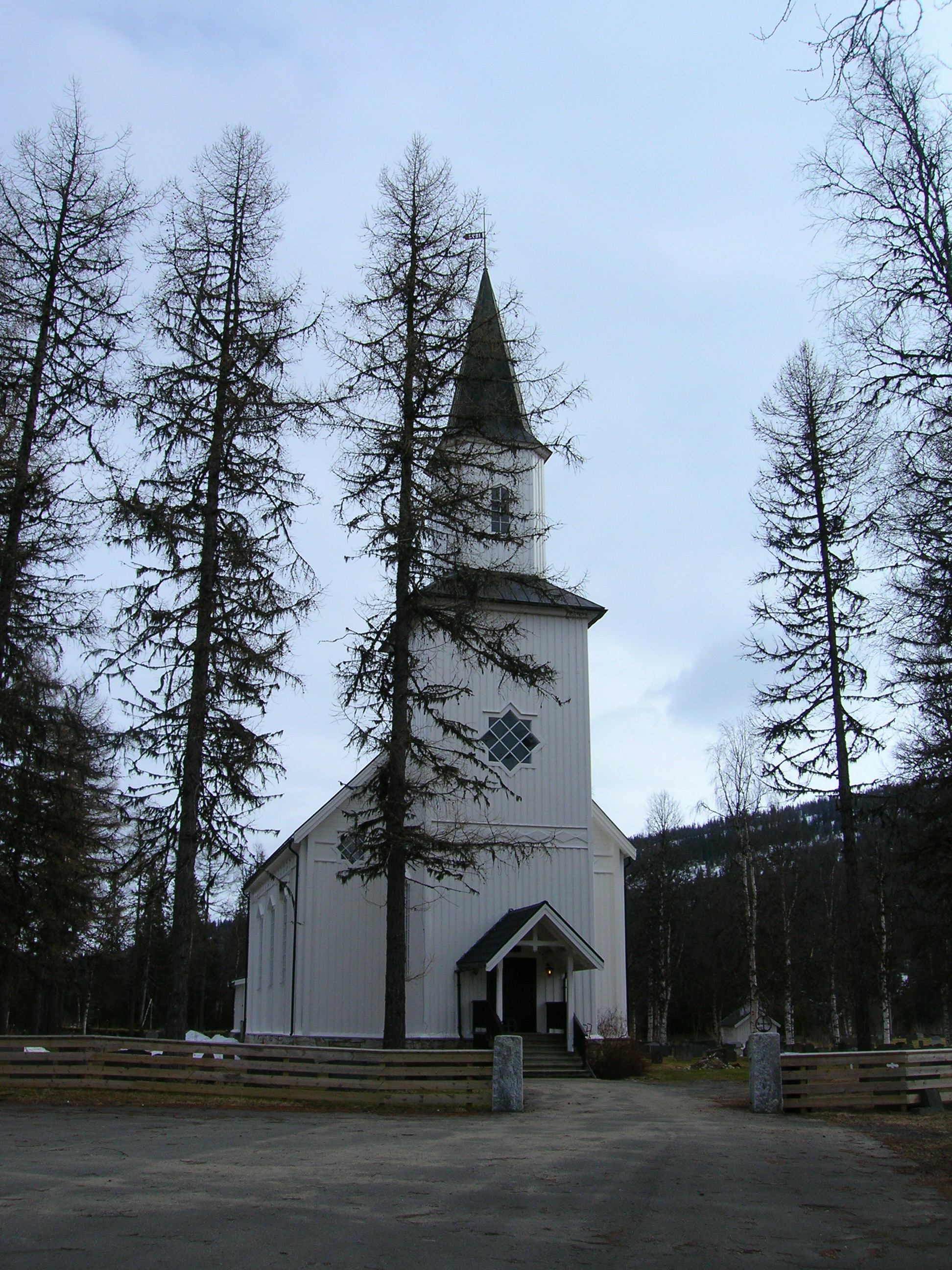

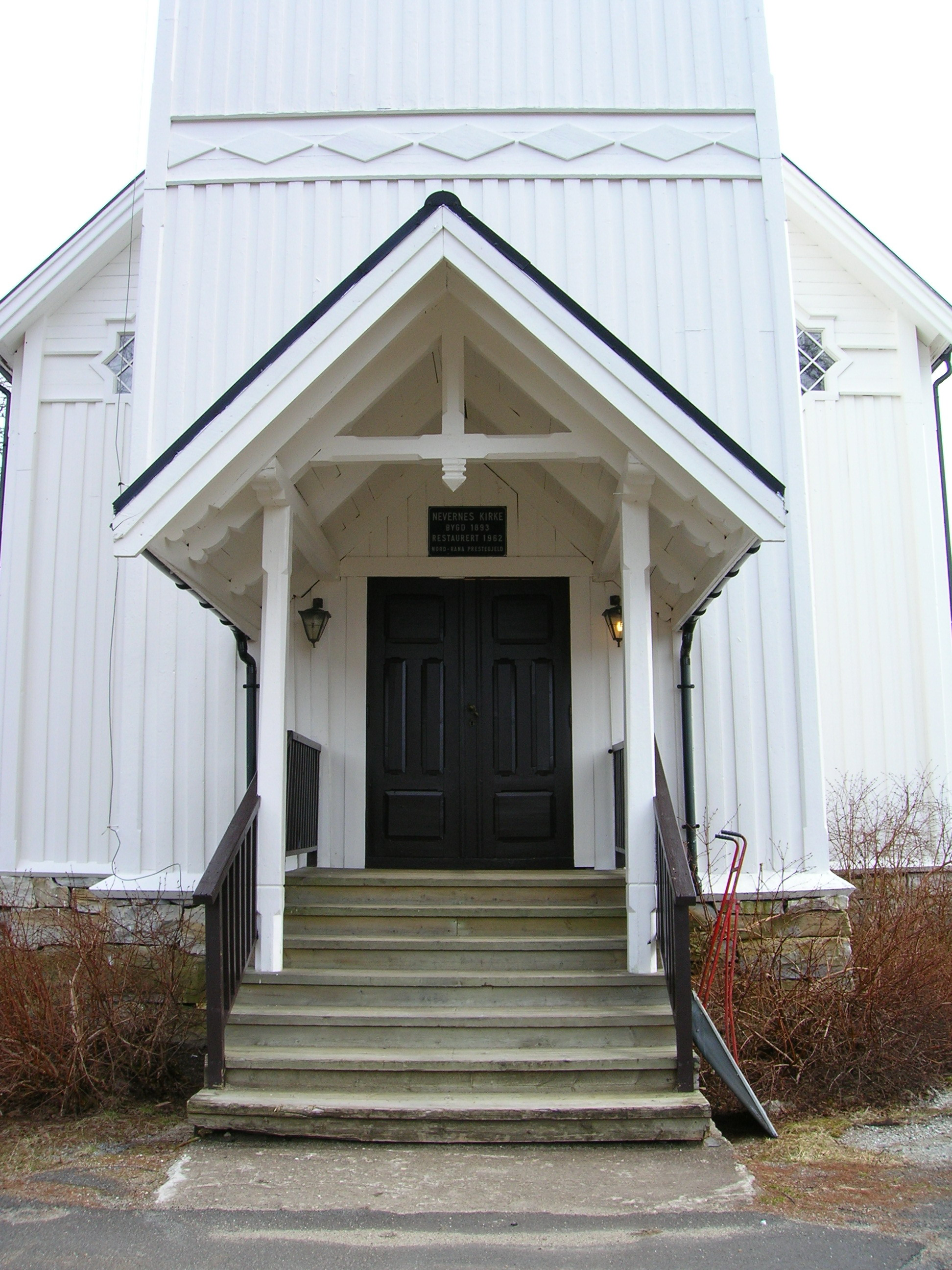

== See also ==
- List of churches in Sør-Hålogaland
