= Sandnessjøen Church =

Church in Nordland, Norway

- Sandnessjøen kirke
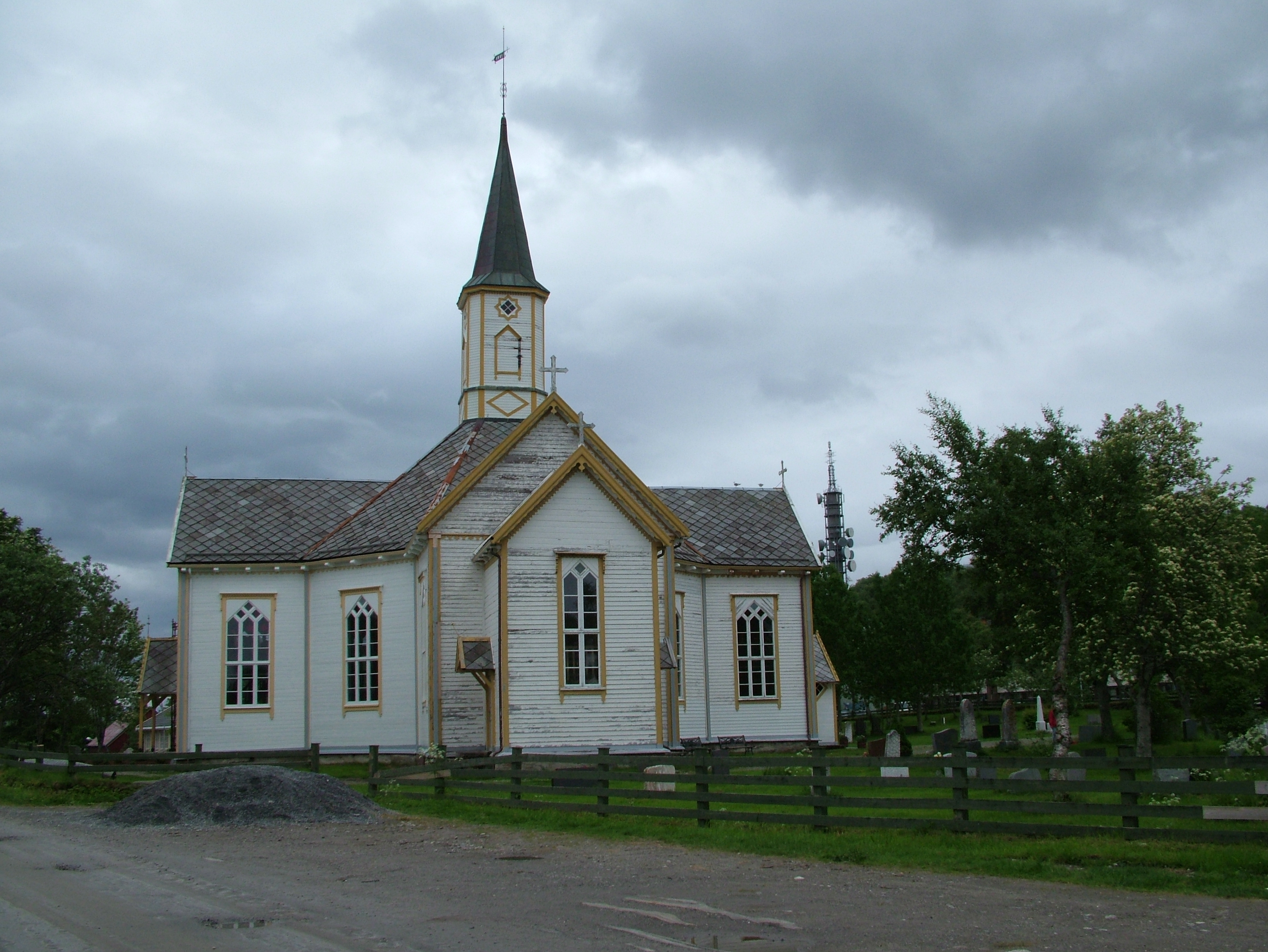
- View of the church
- Sandnessjøen Church
- 66°01′09″N 12°37′06″E
- Location: Alstahaug Municipality, Nordland
- Country: Norway
- Denomination: Church of Norway
- Churchmanship: Evangelical Lutheran

History
- Former name(s): Stamnæs kirke Sandnæs kirke
- Status: Parish church
- Founded: 12th century
- Consecrated: 31 July 1882

Architecture
- Functional status: Active
- Architect: Andreas Grenstad
- Architectural type: Cruciform
- Completed: 1882 (144 years ago)

Specifications
- Capacity: 380
- Materials: Wood

Administration
- Diocese: Sør-Hålogaland
- Deanery: Nord-Helgeland prosti
- Parish: Sandnessjøen
- Norwegian Cultural Heritage Site
- Type: Church
- Status: Listed
- ID: 85545

Sandnessjøen Church (Norwegian: Sandnessjøen kirke) is a parish church of the Church of Norway in Alstahaug Municipality in Nordland county, Norway. It is located in the town of Sandnessjøen. It is the church for the Sandnessjøen parish which is part of the Nord-Helgeland prosti (deanery) in the Diocese of Sør-Hålogaland. The white, wooden church was built in a cruciform style in 1881 by the architect Andreas Grenstad. The church seats about 380 people.

== History ==
The earliest existing historical records of the church date back to the year 1240 when the church was mentioned in the book Hákonar saga Hákonarsonar. The original church was built at Sandnes about 2 kilometres (1.2 mi) southwest of the present church site. In 1644, the old church was torn down and a new church was built on the same site. The new church was a timber-framed cruciform building with an entry porch on the west end and a small sacristy on the east end.

In 1767, the area of Leirfjord was added to this parish, so it was decided that the church site should be moved to Stamnæs, about 2 kilometres (1.2 mi) to the northeast so that it would be more centrally located within the parish. So in 1768, a new cruciform church was completed at Stamnæs and the old church in Sandnæs was torn down. In 1774, there was a fire in the church that caused some damages and needed to be repaired.

In 1882, the old church was torn down and replaced with a new church on the same site. Some of the materials from the old church were reused in the construction of the new building. The church was consecrated on 31 July 1882 by the bishop Jacob Sverdrup Smitt.

== Media gallery ==
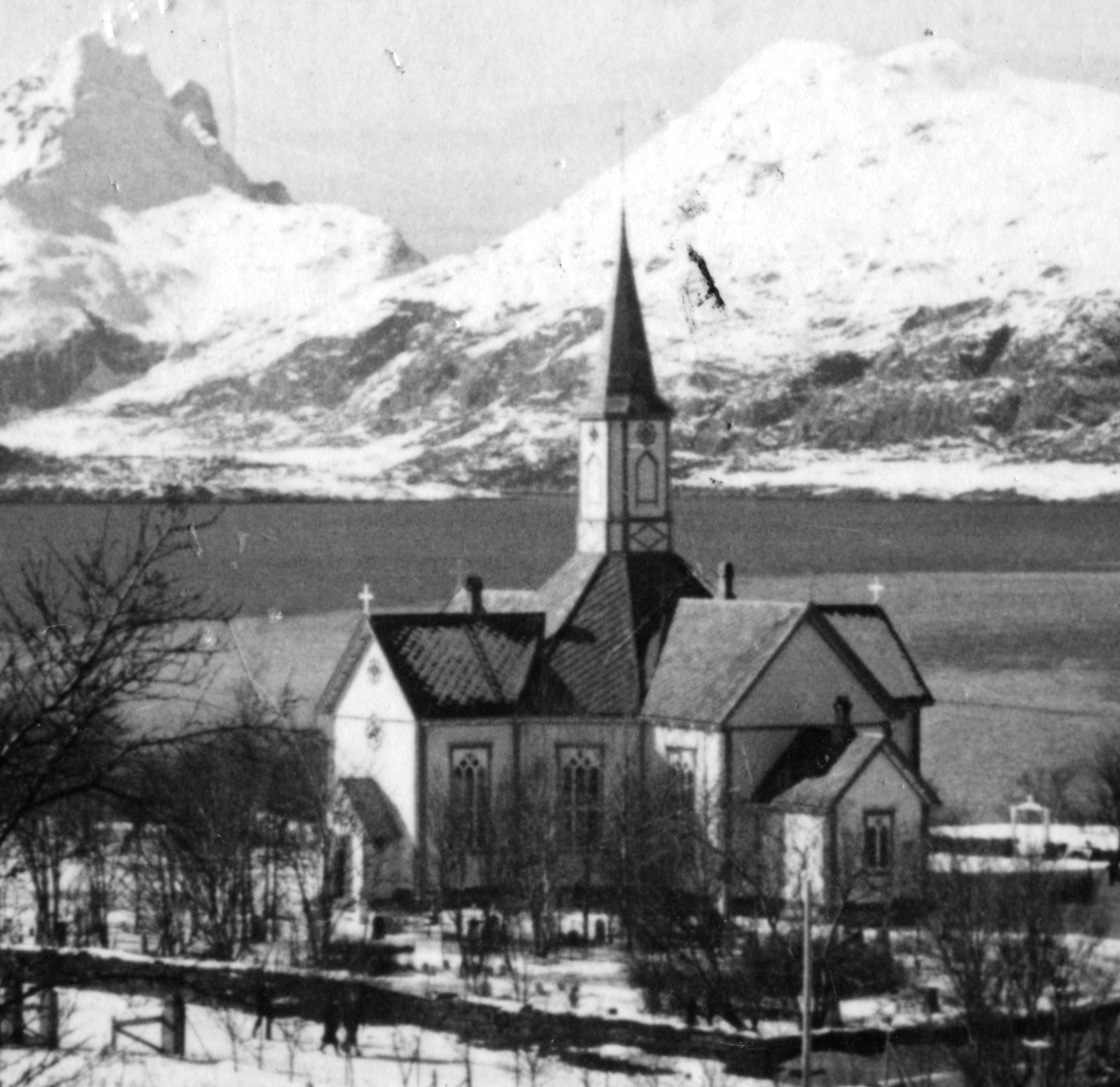

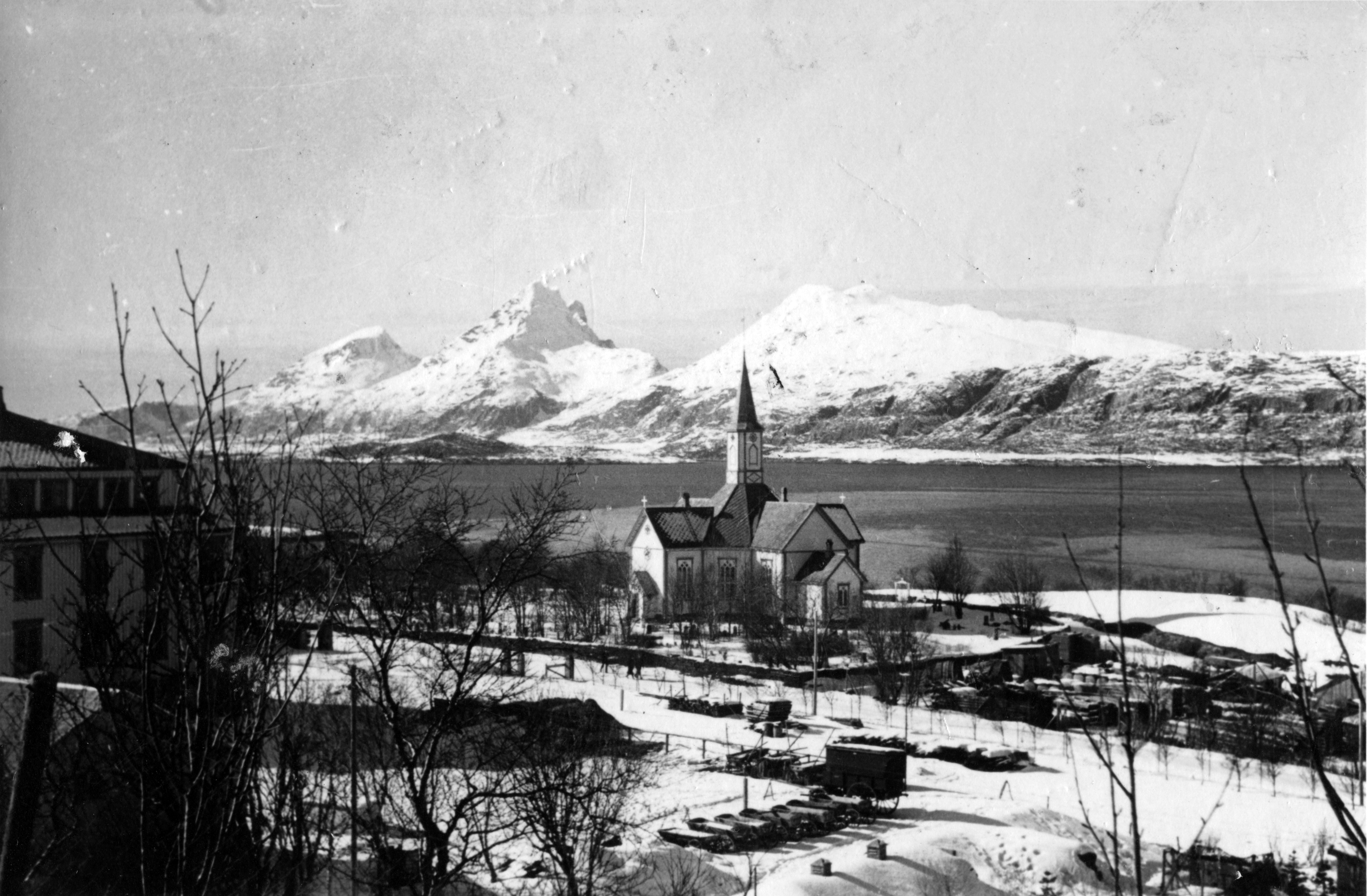

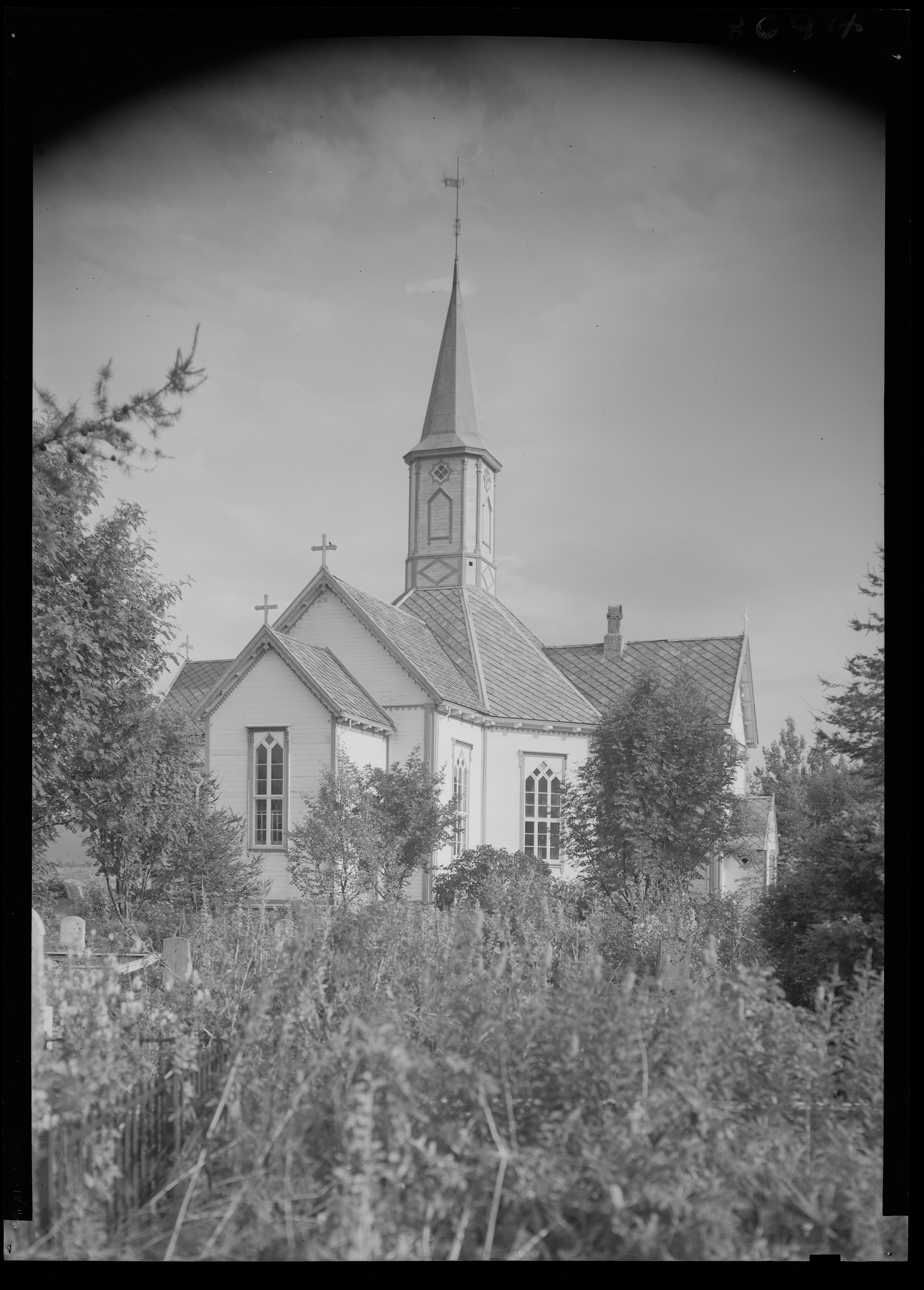

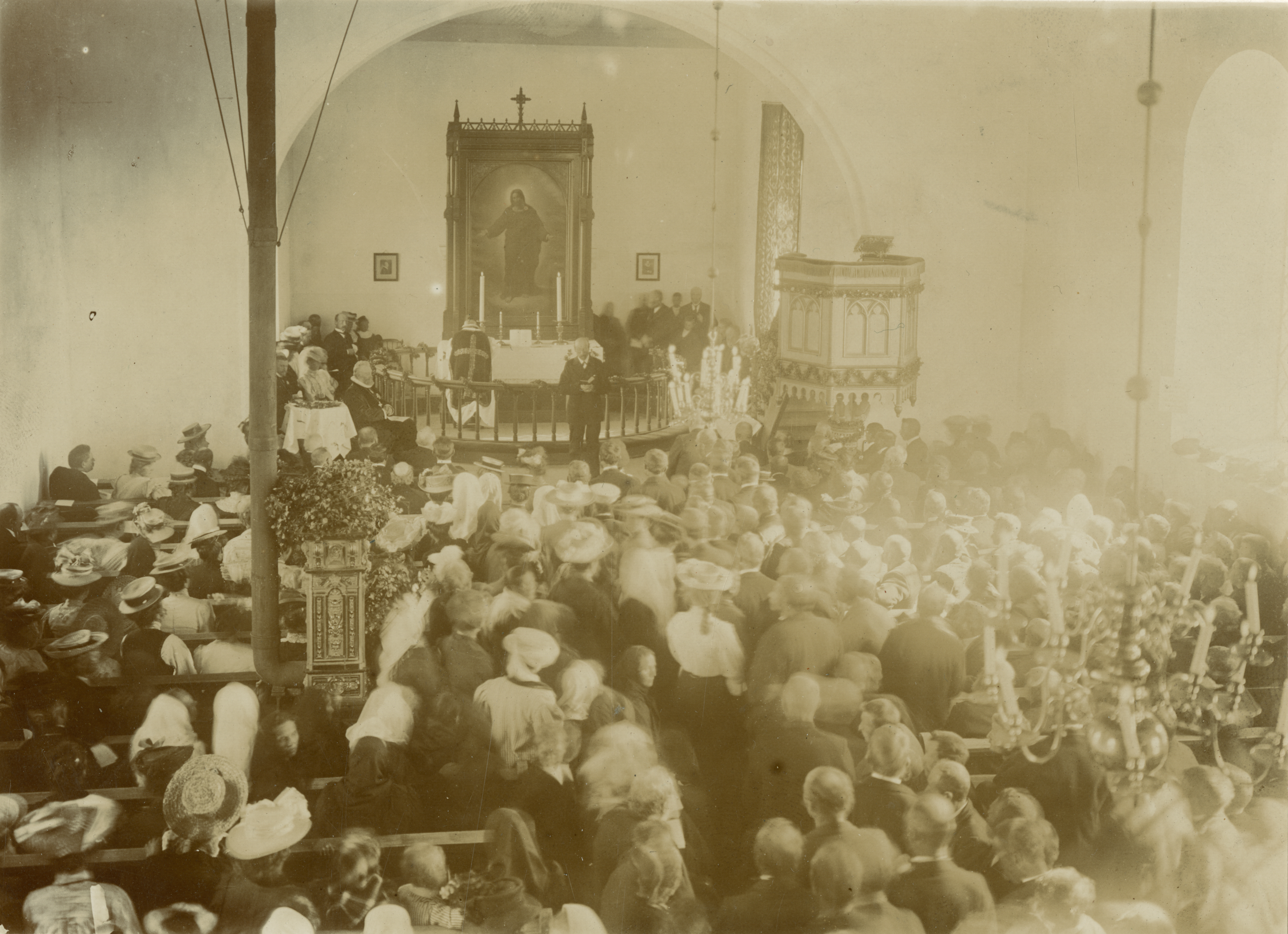

== See also ==
- List of churches in Sør-Hålogaland
