= Tverrvatnet =

Lake in Rana, Norway

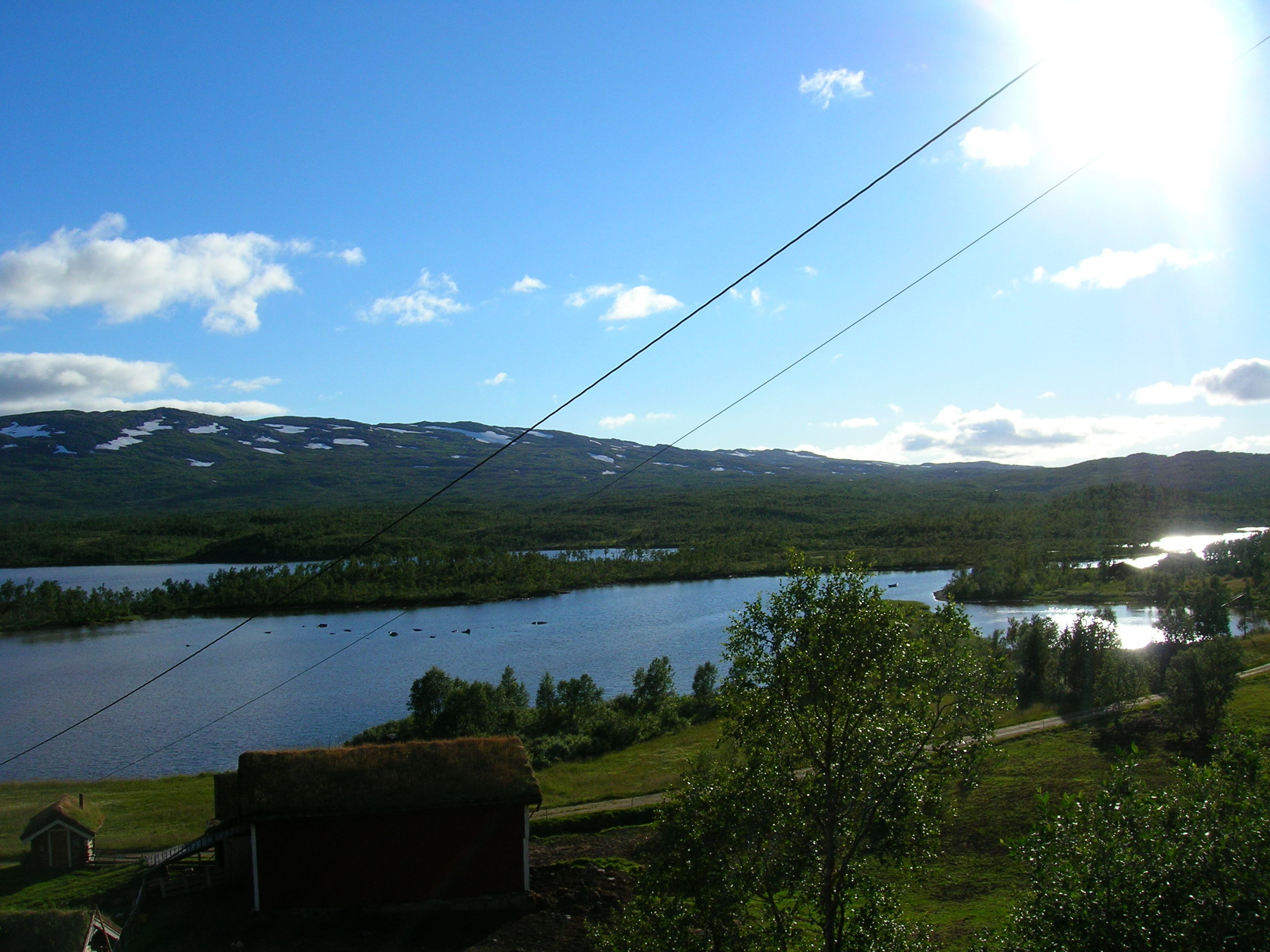
- View of the lake from the local farm
- Interactive map of the lake
- Location: Rana Municipality, Nordland
- Coordinates: 66.2362°N 14.5537°E
- Primary outflows: Raudvatnet
- Catchment area: Tverråga
- Basin countries: Norway
- Max. length: 2.5 kilometres (1.6 mi)
- Max. width: 1 kilometre (0.62 mi)
- Surface area: 1.5 km^{2} (0.58 sq mi)
- Shore length^{1}: 8.7 kilometres (5.4 mi)
- Surface elevation: 501 metres (1,644 ft)
- References: NVE
- ^{1} Shore length is not a well-defined measure.

Tverrvatnet [tvær'vatne] is a lake in Rana Municipality in Nordland county, Norway. The European route E12 highway passes along the northern and eastern shores of the lake between the town of Mo i Rana and the border with Sweden. Tverrvatnet gets its name from the fact that it is located "across" (Norwegian: på tvers), in a north–south direction, while most lakes in Rana are located in an east–west direction.

== Watershed ==
The water in Tverrvatnet flows northwards into the lake Raudvatnet. The two lakes are connected by a short channel of water which is why the lake is sometimes considered to be the southern part of Raudvatnet. The river Tverråga flows to the north out of Raudvatnet towards the Ranfjorden. The river Tverråga is thus named after the lake Tverrvatnet, and those who gave the river Tverråga its name, did not consider Raudvatnet as a lake of its own, but as the northern part of Tverrvatnet. If Raudvatnet was the original name, the correct name of the river Tverråga, in local dialect, would in fact have been "Rauvassåga".

The primary source of water into Tverrvatnet is Umskarbekken ("the Umskar stream"), flowing northwards from Umskartjørnet ("the Umskar water") on Umskaret. From the west, a brook from Fisktjønna ("the fish water") ends up as a tributary to Umskarbekken.

== Tverrvassgården ==
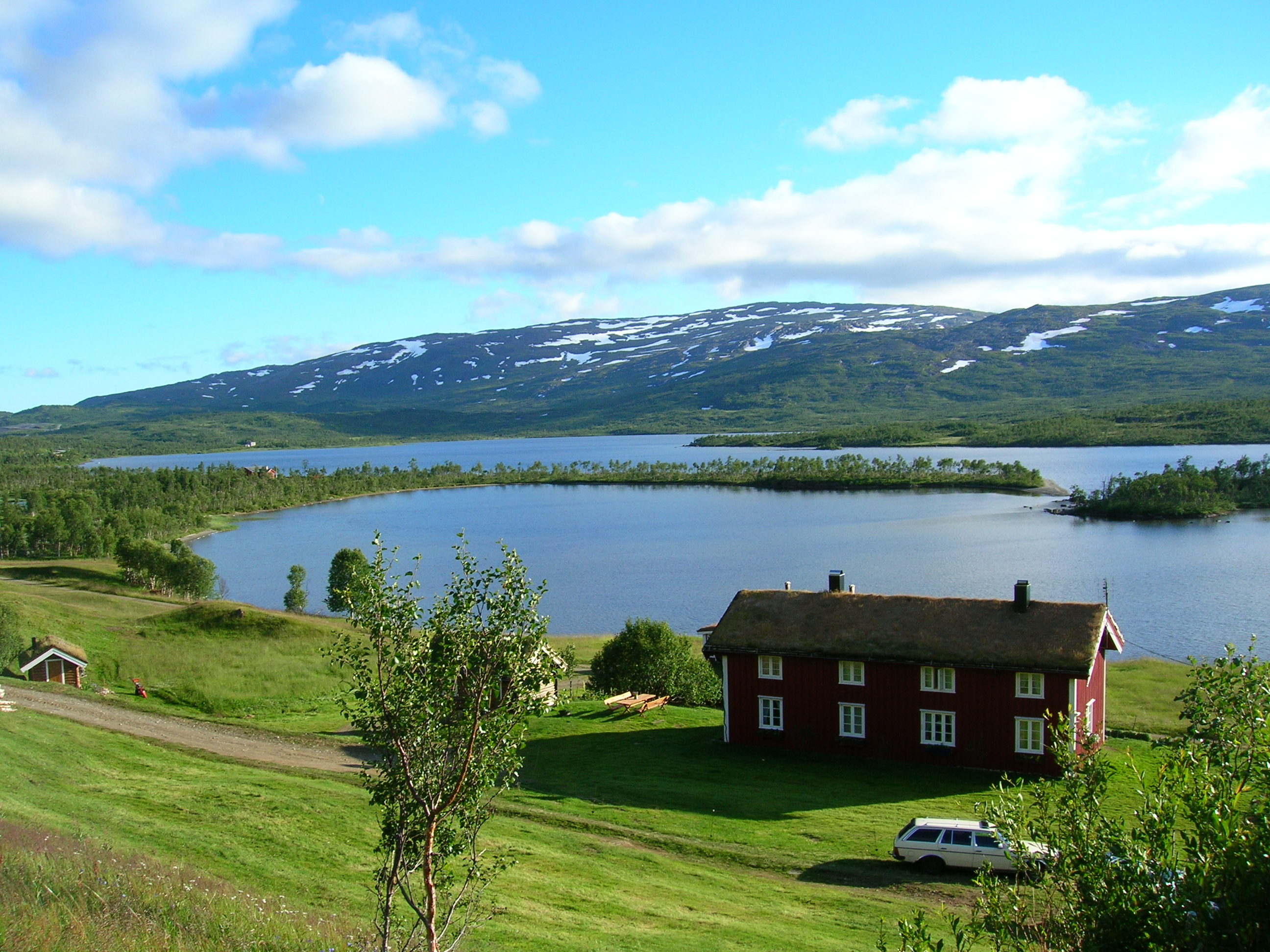
View of the farm

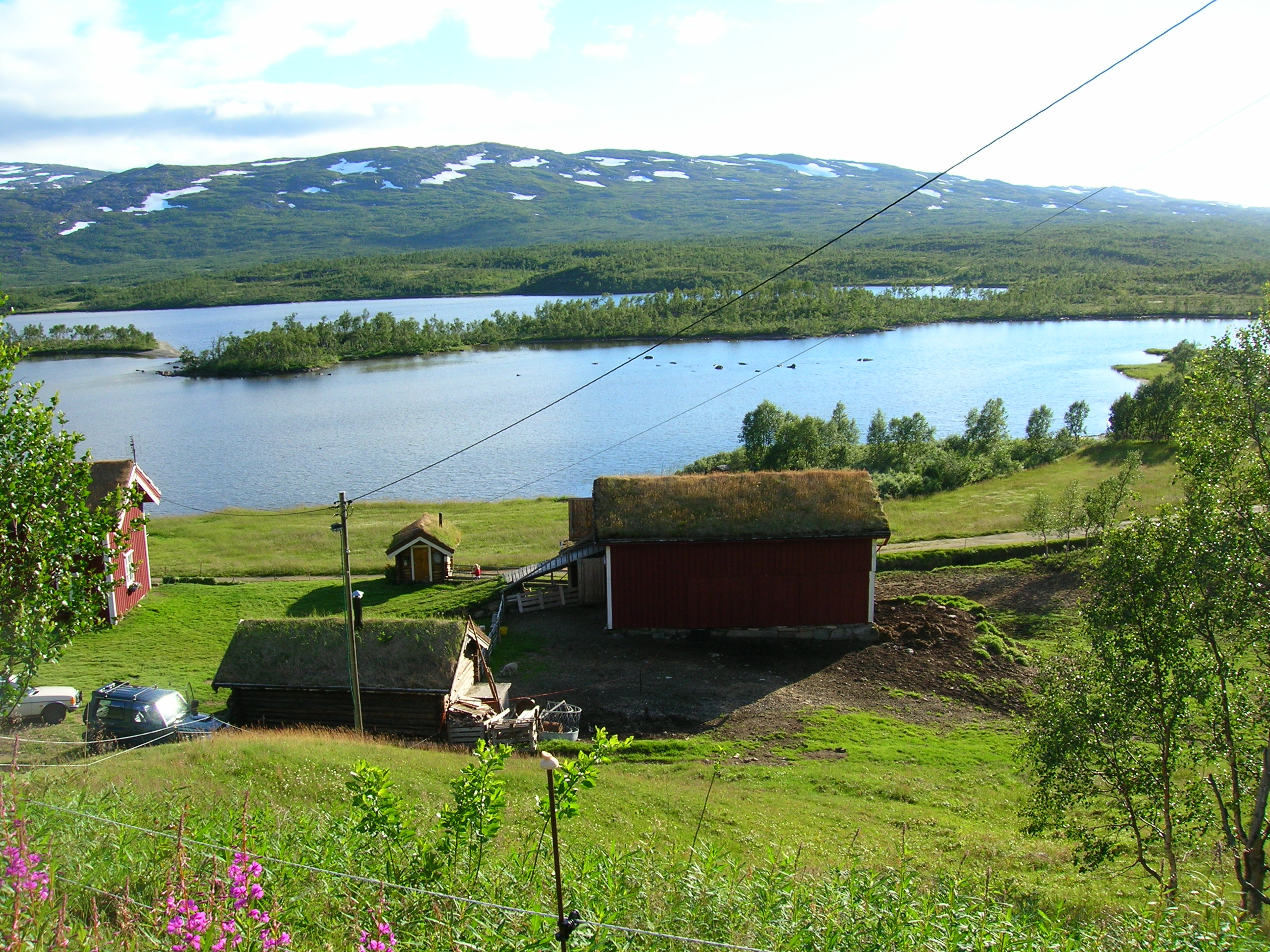
View of the farm

The area east of Tverrvatnet was cleared by a farmer named Andreas in the 1770s. The Tverrvatnet farm (now called Tverrvassgården) was built on an important rallying point among the Ume Sami speaking population. An official document of 11 November 1789 declared Elias Nilssa (1752–1838) from Åga as the leaseholder. The next leaseholders were:

- Around 1812: Kristoffer Eliassa (1784–1848)
- During the 1850s: Elias Kristoffersen (1827–1902)
- During the 1890s: Kristian Johan Eliassen (1859–1935)
- During the 1930s: Anders Olaus Kristiansen (1888–)
- November 19, 1955: John Pettersen

The farm could not grow grain, but potatoes and grass grew well. Potatoes were not grown along the lake Raudvatnet to the north.

In 1803, the farm was taxed to 10 Swedish riksdaler, able to sow 1/2 and reap 1 barrel of grain. During the census in 1801, 5 people worked and lived on the farm. In 1838, the farm was registered in a cadastre. In 1845, the farm had 1 horse, 10 cows, 12 sheep and 4 goats. They also cultivated barley and potatoes. During the census of 1865, 8 people lived there, with 1 horse, 9 cows, and 6 sheep. Barley and potatoes were still cultivated.

The owner Jacob Coldevin sold the farm to the Norwegian state in 1888.

Tverrvatnet farm is the oldest farm in Rana, still running (2008). On 4 December 2006, the farmers on Tverrvatnet farm were honored with the Cultural landscape prize (Norwegian: "Kulturlandskapsprisen"), for their work on restoring the farm.

Tverrvatnet farm was an important link of the trade between Sweden and Mo i Rana, before the opening on 13 August 1939 of the highway what was later named European route E12. Traders from Sweden spent their nights there. In 1904, traders paid 5 øre for an overnight stop and 10 øre if the trader brought with him a horse.

The farm was of uttermost importance during the catastrophic year of hunger on the Swedish side of the border in 1867. The situation in northern Sweden was so critical that King Oscar II of Sweden visited Mo i Rana on 13 July 1873, discussing the needs of a road between northern Sweden and Mo i Rana.
