= Raudvatnet =

Lake in Rana, Nordland, Norway

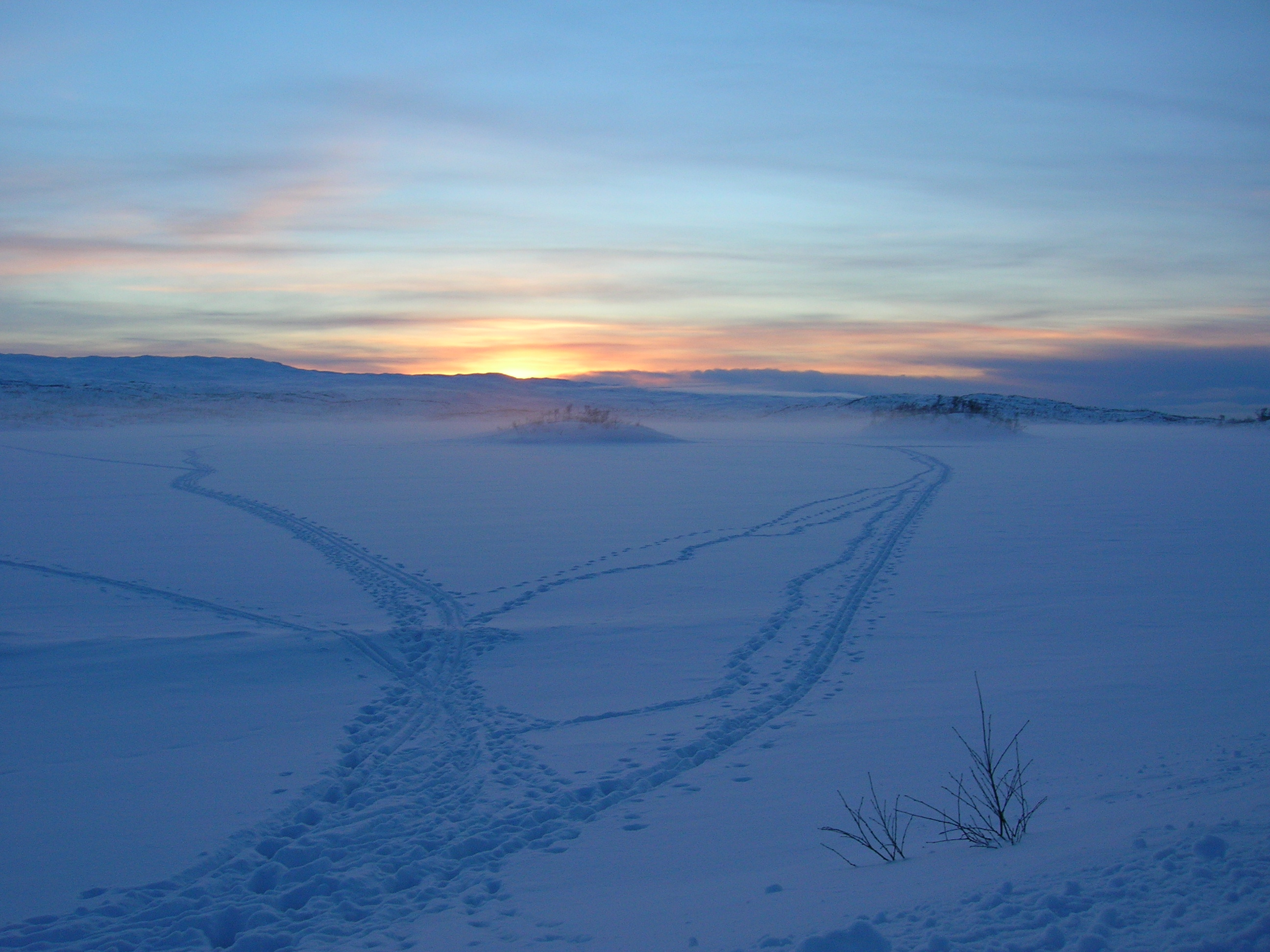
- in wintertime (February 2006)
- Interactive map of the lake
- Location: Rana Municipality, Nordland
- Coordinates: 66.2773°N 14.5162°E
- Primary inflows: Tverrvatnet
- Primary outflows: Tverråga
- Basin countries: Norway
- Max. length: 3 kilometres (1.9 mi)
- Max. width: 2.5 kilometres (1.6 mi)
- Surface area: 4.45 km^{2} (1.72 sq mi)
- Shore length^{1}: 20 kilometres (12 mi)
- Surface elevation: 488 metres (1,601 ft)
- Frozen: in winter
- Islands: Killingholmen
- References: NVE
- ^{1} Shore length is not a well-defined measure.

Raudvatnet (lit. 'the red lake') is a lake in Rana Municipality in Nordland county, Norway. The European route E12 highway passes along the northern and eastern shores of the lake between the town of Mo i Rana and the border with Sweden. A Red cross hut (Norwegian: Rauvasshytta) is located east of the lake Raudvatnet. Water flows into the lake Raudvatnet primarily from the nearby lake Tverrvatnet to the south. From Raudvatnet, the water flows into the river Tverråga, a tributary to the main river Ranelva.

Raudvatnet is rich on trout and Arctic char, and is a popular lake for hobby fishermen, both in the summer and the winter (ice fishing). Raudvatnet and the surrounding area is a popular recreation area. Blåvegenløpet Skifestival ("the Blue road ski festival") begins at Raudvatnet. It is organized by the IL Stålkameratene sports club. There are also about 550 cabins located around the lake, and work is going on to make electricity available to their owners.

== Name ==
Raudvatnet has its name from the mountain Raudfjellet ("the red mountain"), north of the lake. The mountain is red due to hematite, which historically was extracted in order to make house paint in Rana Municipality. From 1911 to 1919, the mining company Bossmo Gruber extracted pyrite from Raudfjellet in the mine Mossgruven. Hematite from this red mountain was also the source of house painting in Northern Sweden. It explains why most houses there are red, and also the Swedish common name den Røda Stugan ("the red house") when referring to their homes in the Swedish municipalities of Sorsele and Storuman.

The lake Litle Raudvatn ("small Raudvatn") is located nearby in the Plura River watershed. In order to distinguish between these lakes, Raudvatnet is sometimes also called Store Raudvatn ("large Raudvatn").

== Inhabitants ==
The lake Raudvatnet is located in Sami territory, where the traditional speakers of the Ume Sami language once flourished. Breeding reindeer is an essential part of the economy of the Samis around the lake. During wintertime the reindeer are corralled east of the lake Raudvatnet and south of the mountain Raudfjellet. In the summertime, they graze on grass in the areas east of Raudvatnet and south of Tverrvatnet.

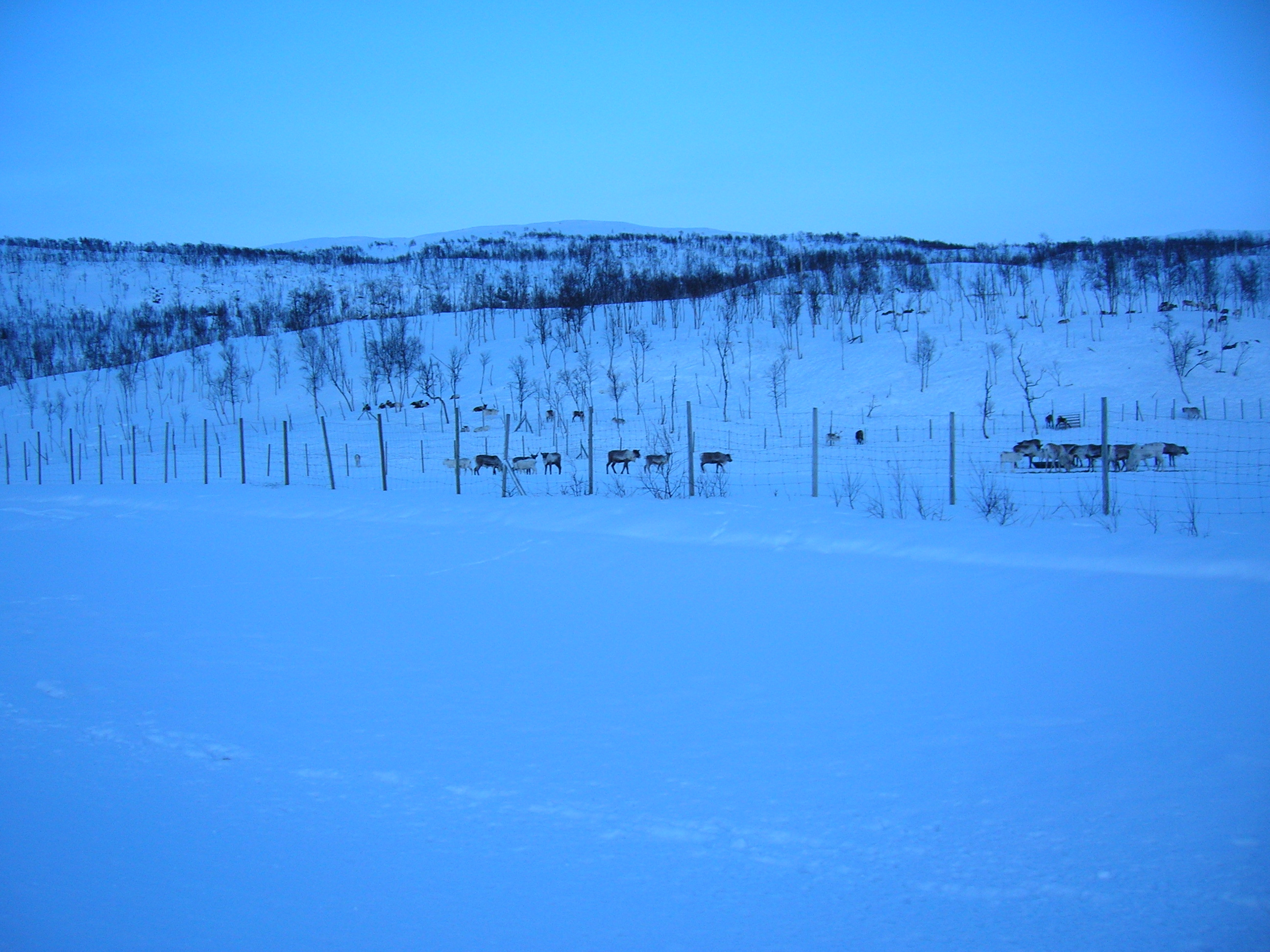

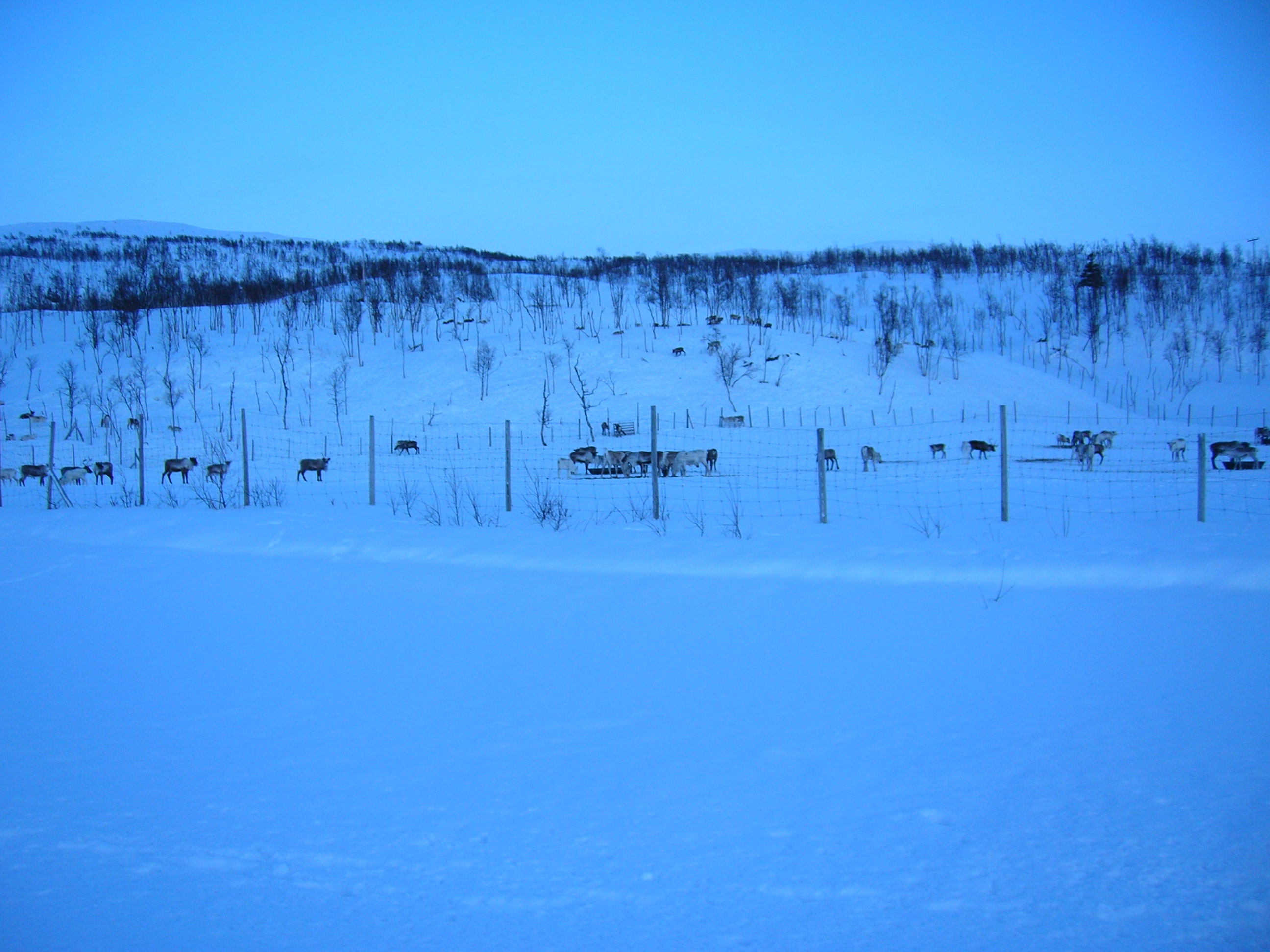

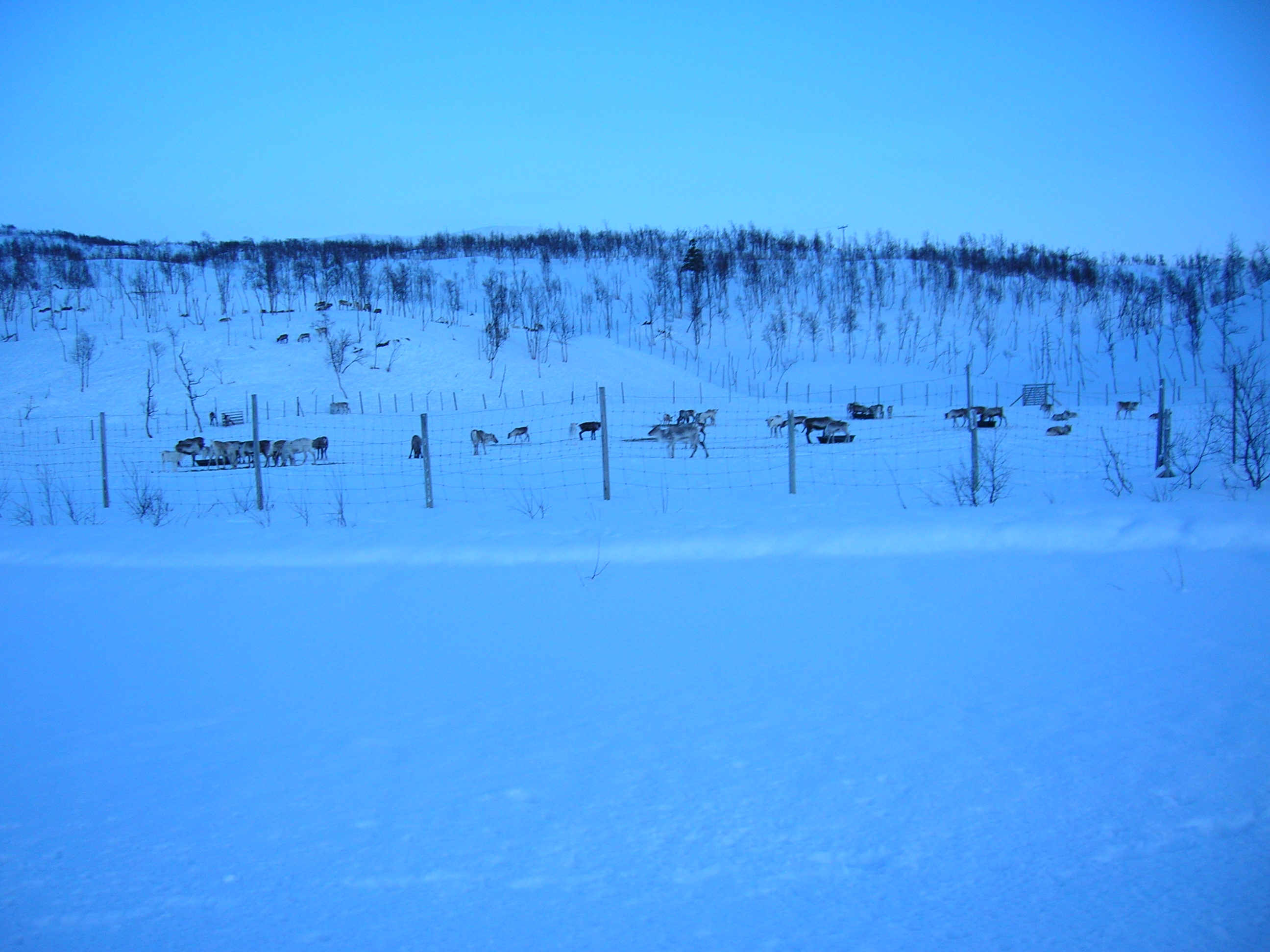

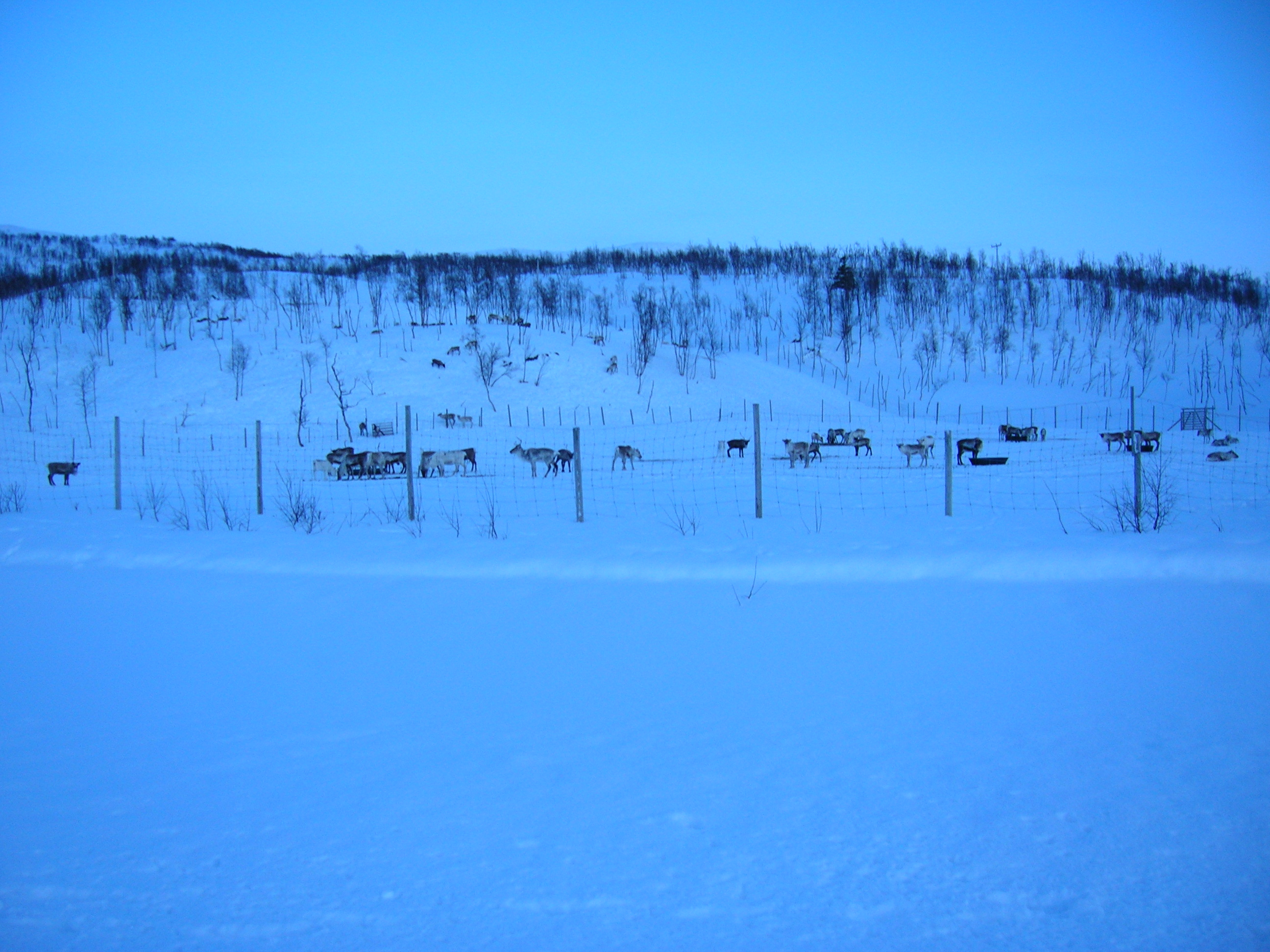

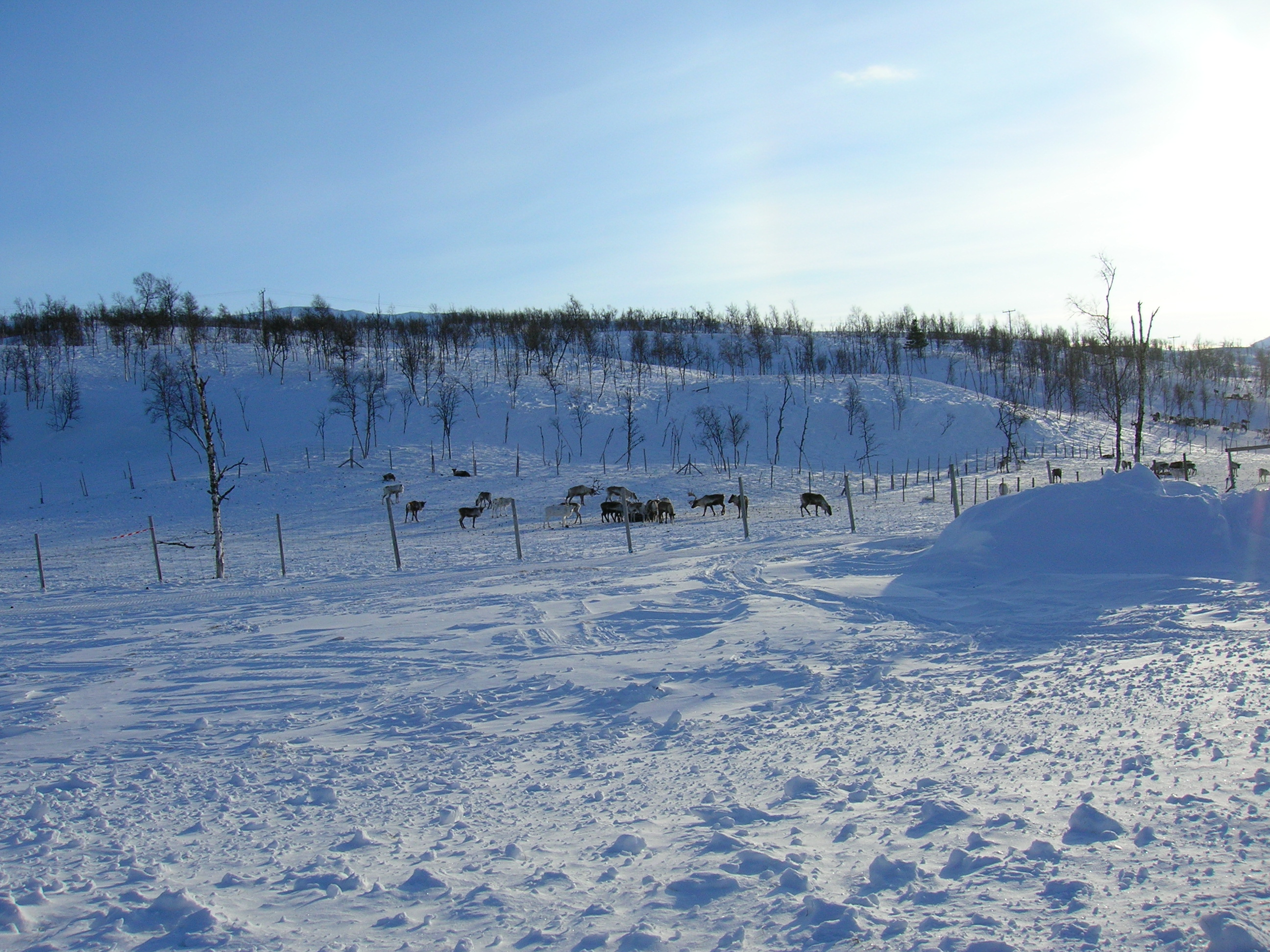

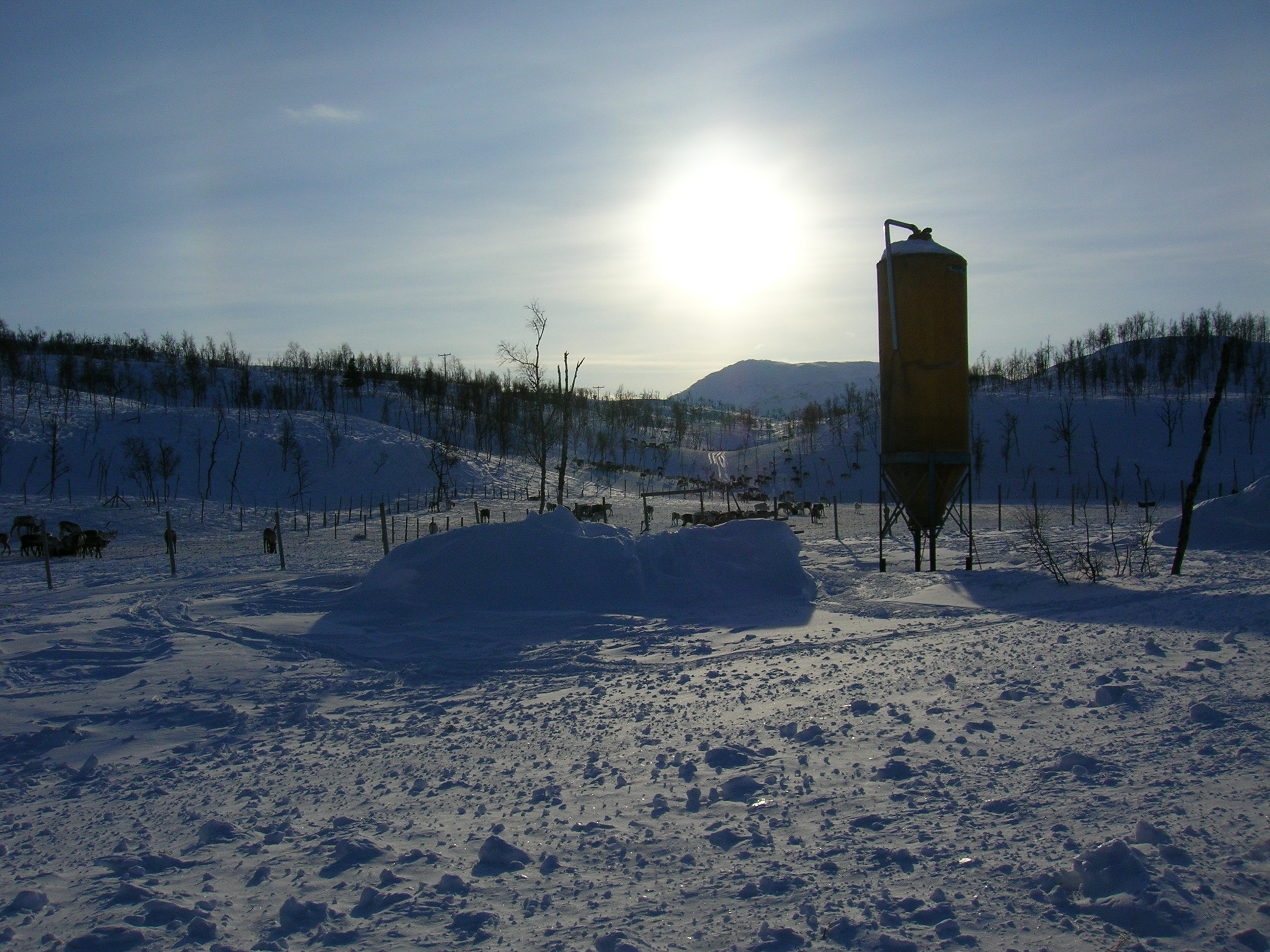

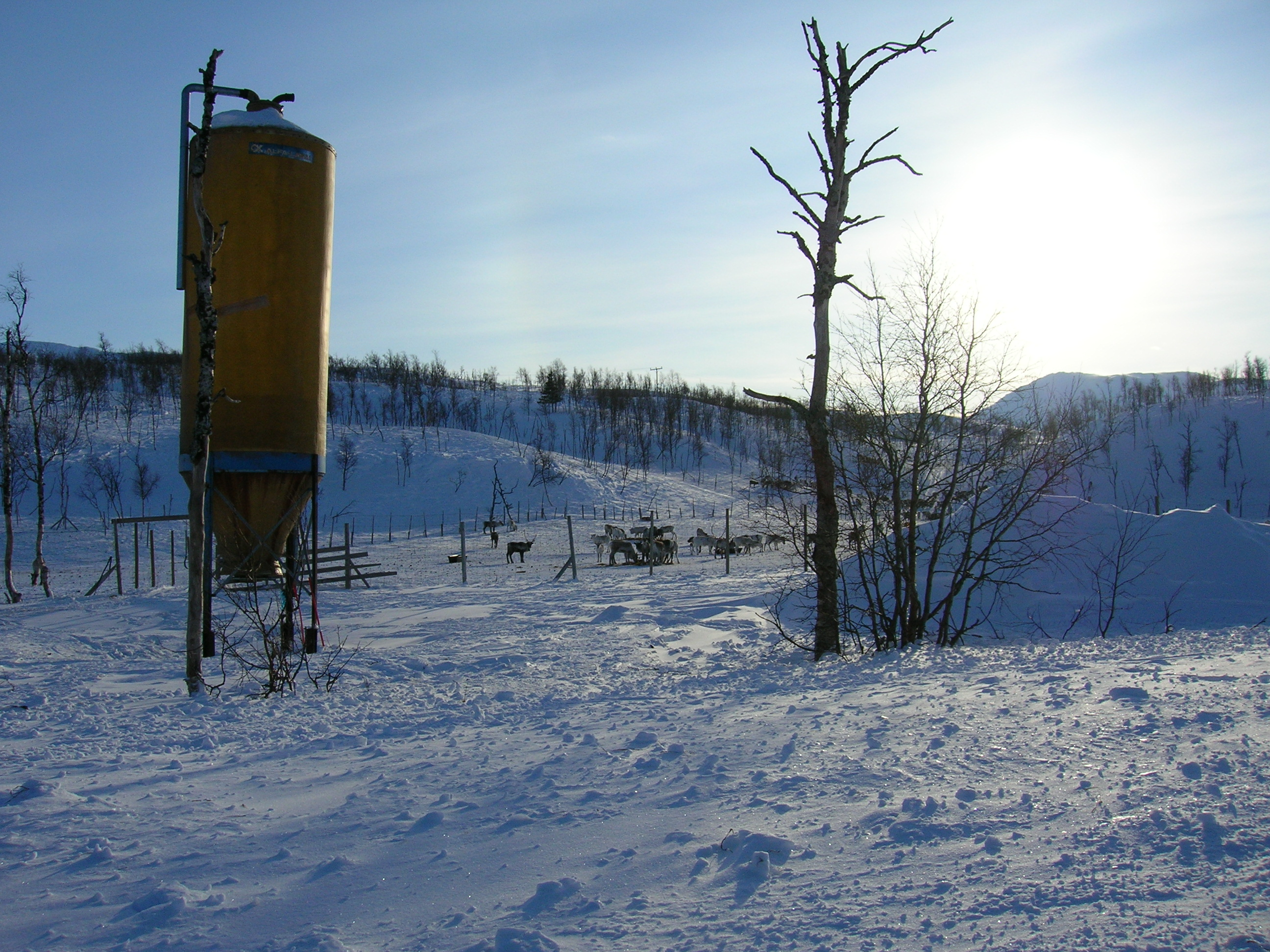

== Media Gallery ==
=== Winter ===
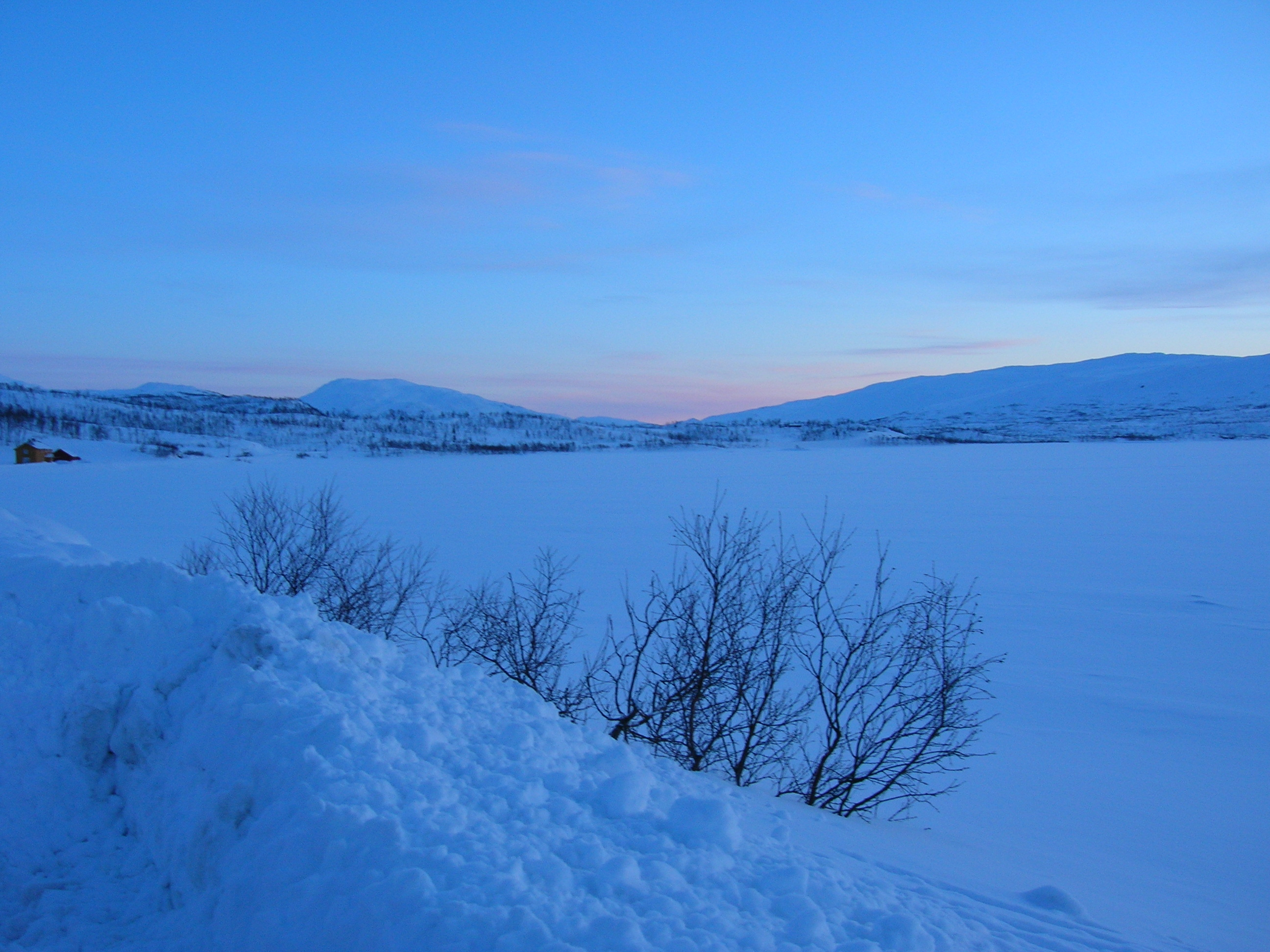
Eastern side

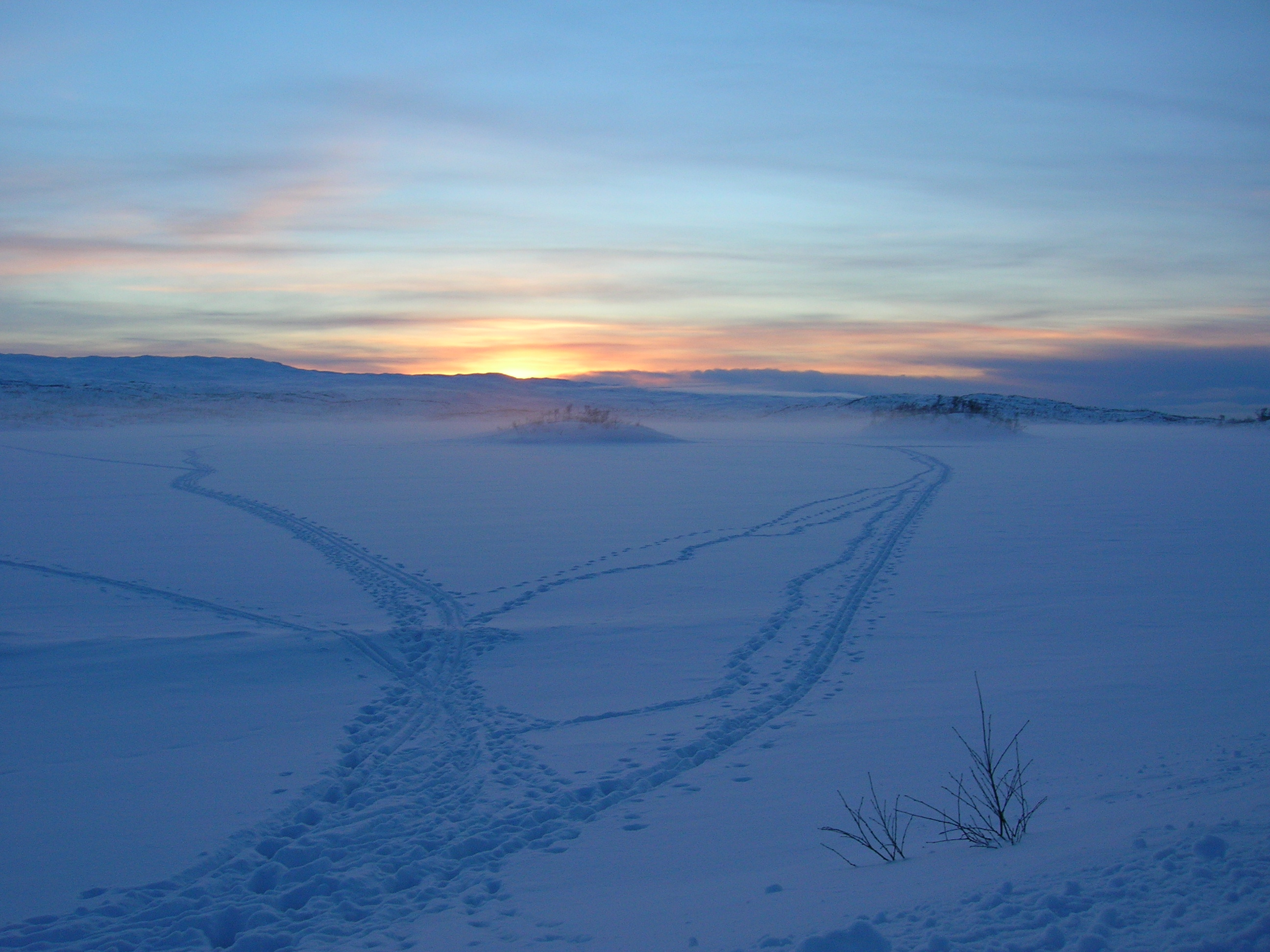
Eastern side

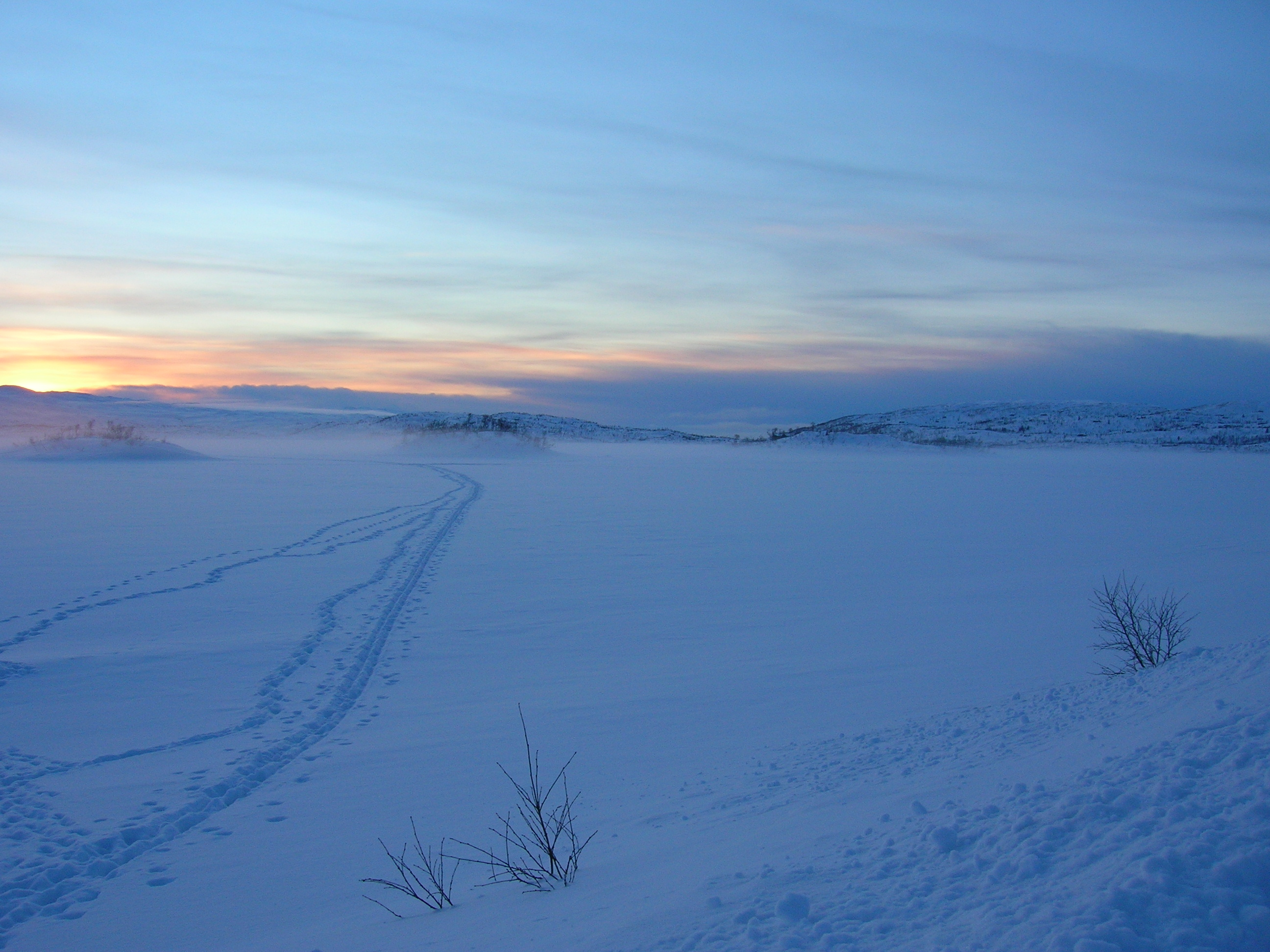
Eastern side

=== Summer ===
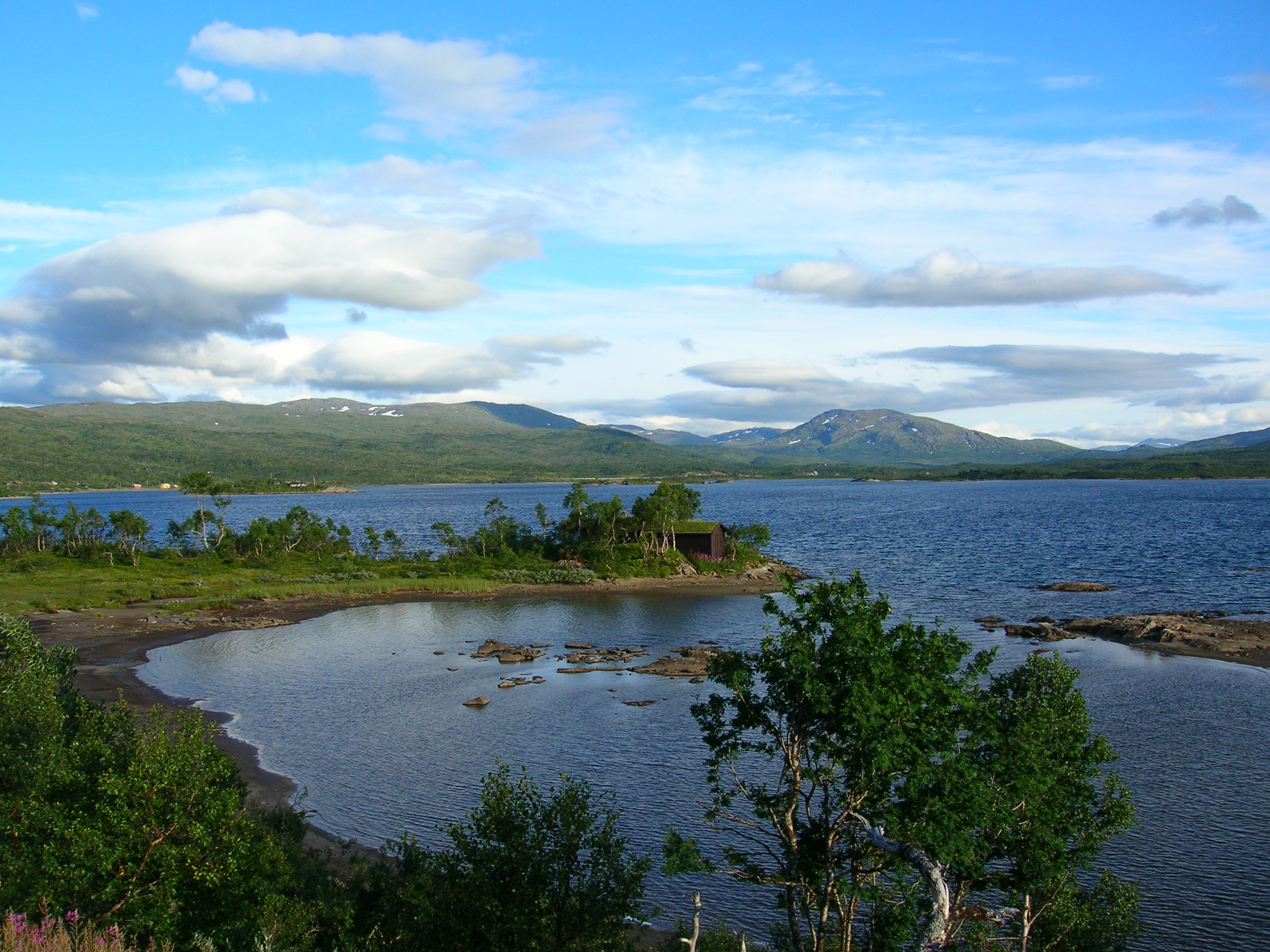
Northern side

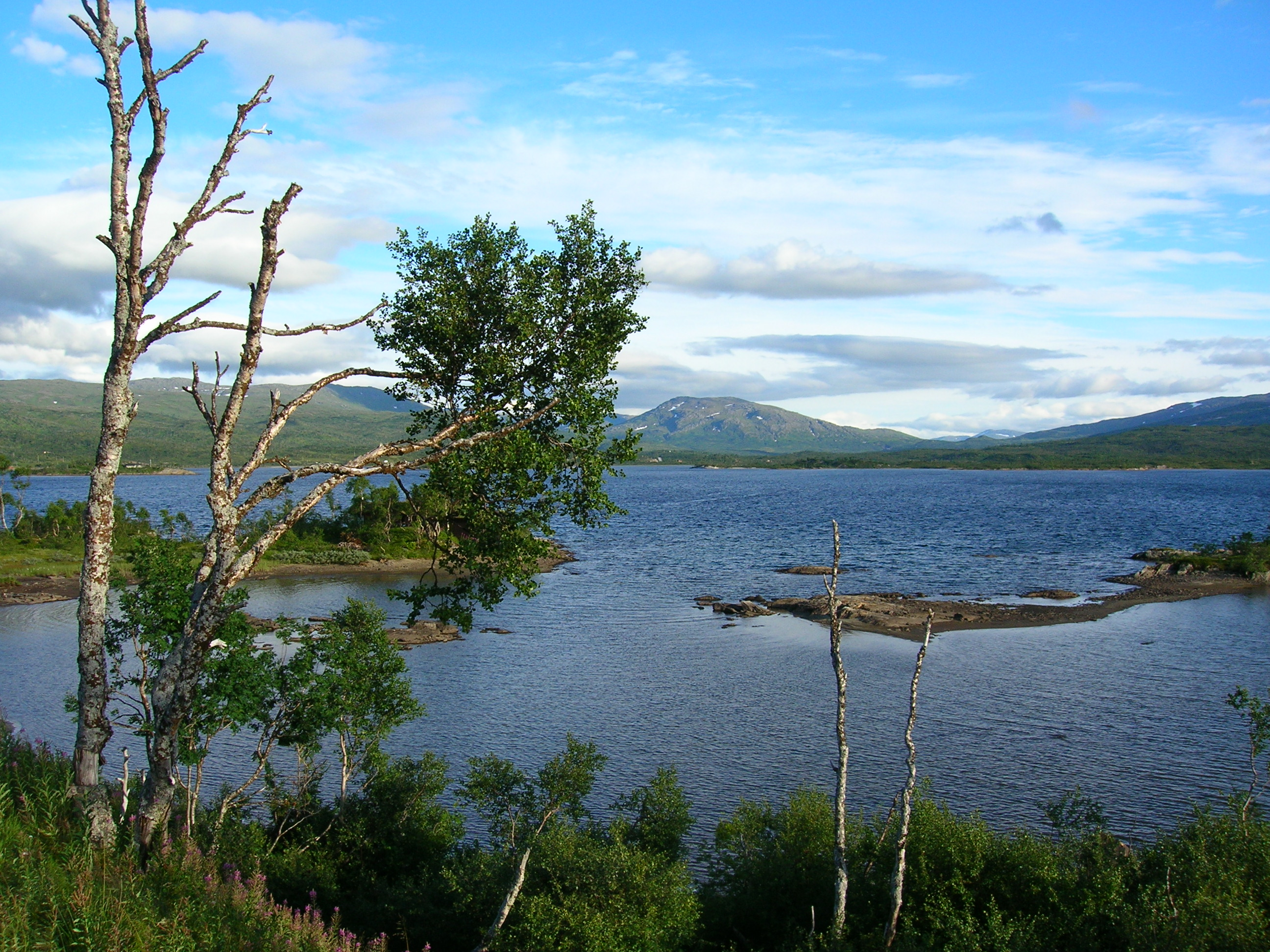
Northern side

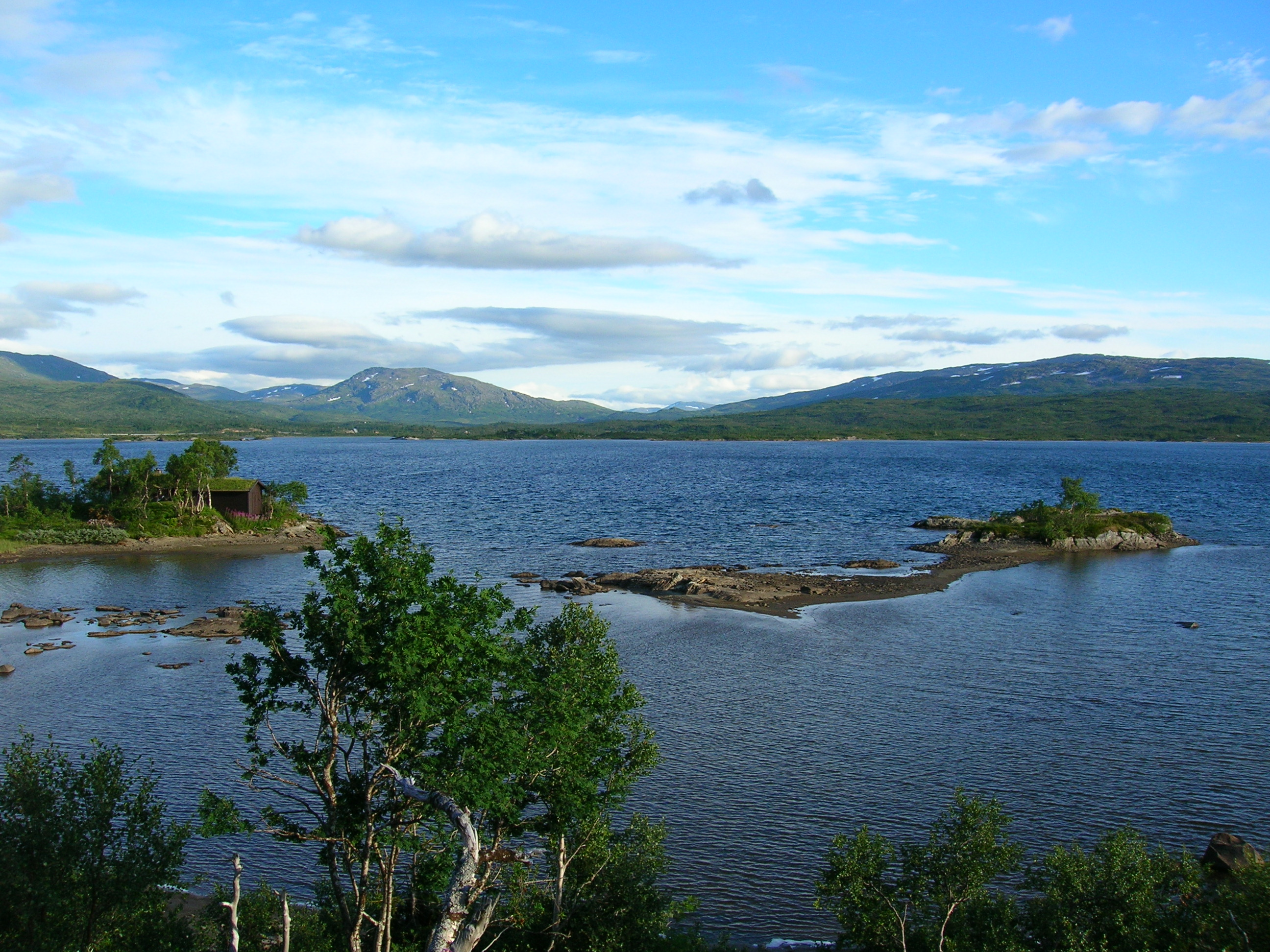
Northern side

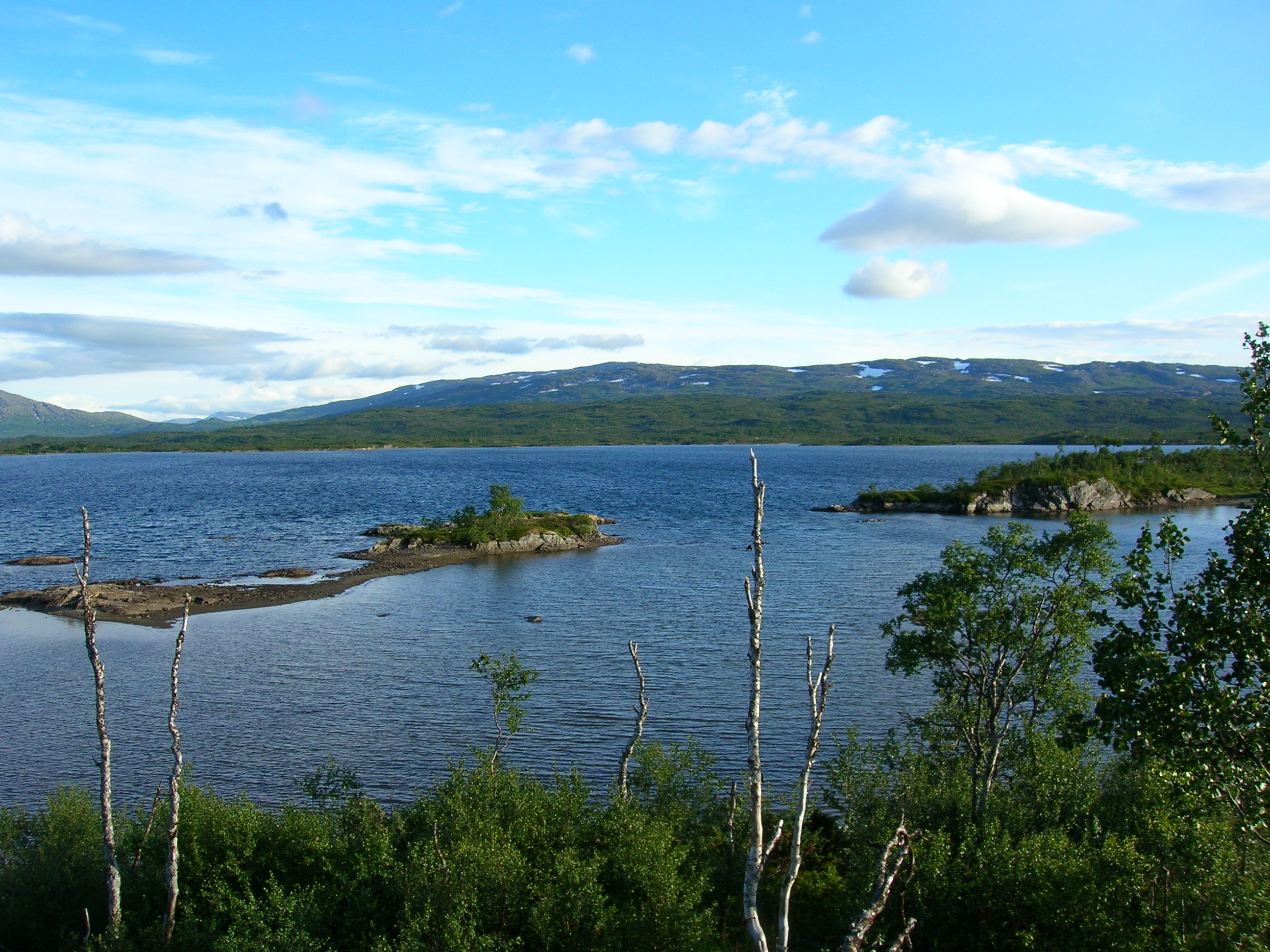
Northern side

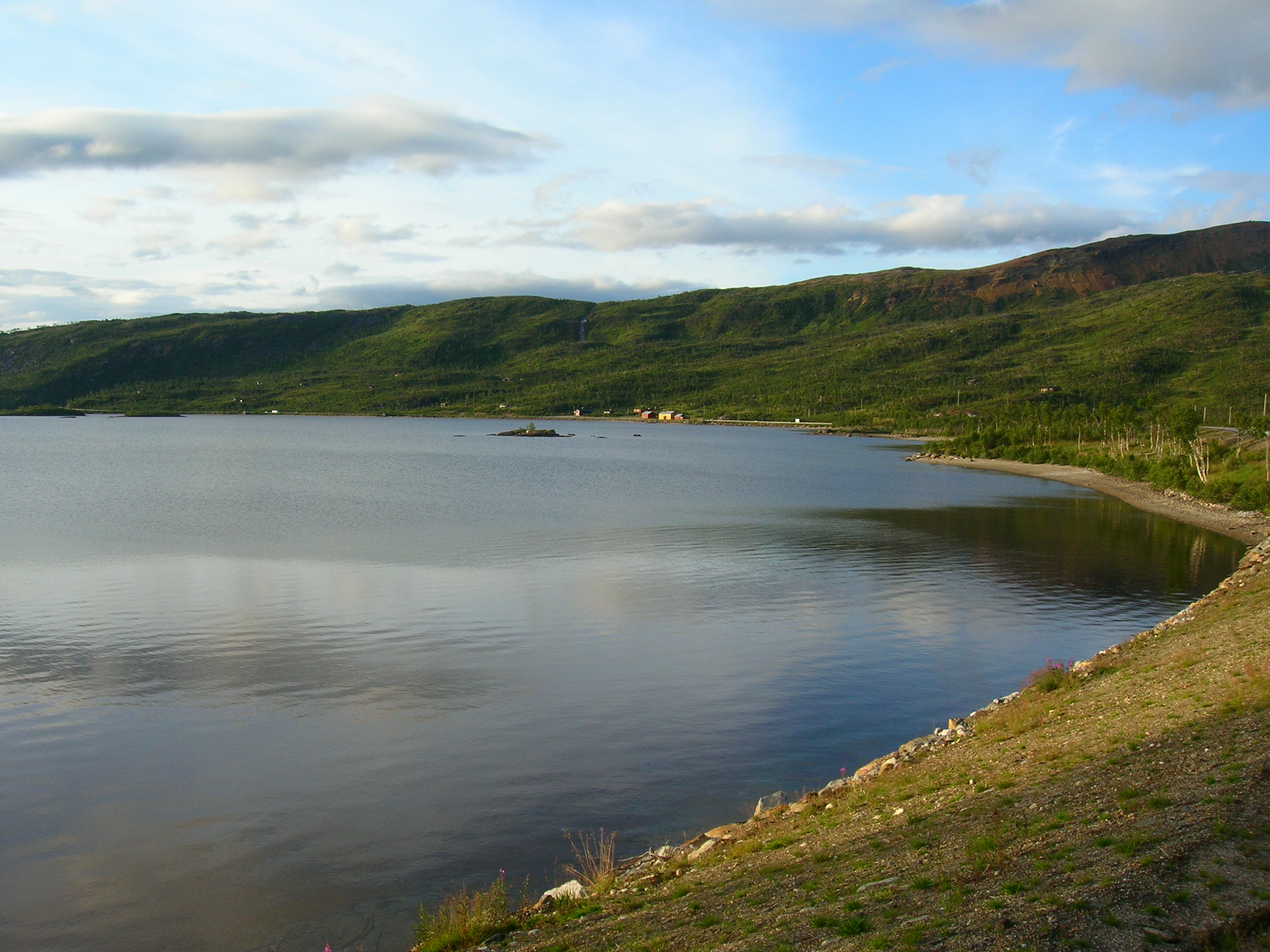
Eastern side

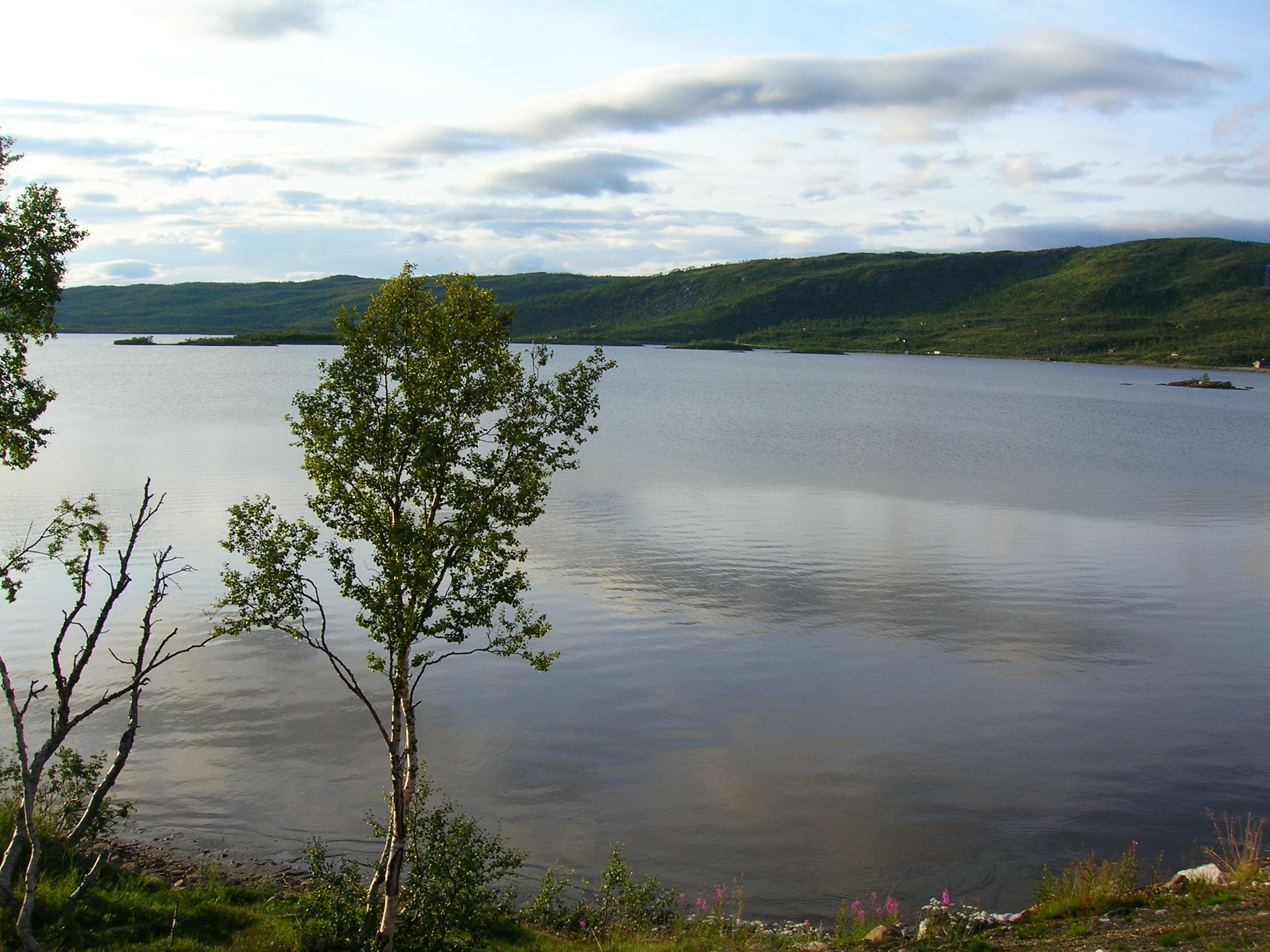
Eastern side

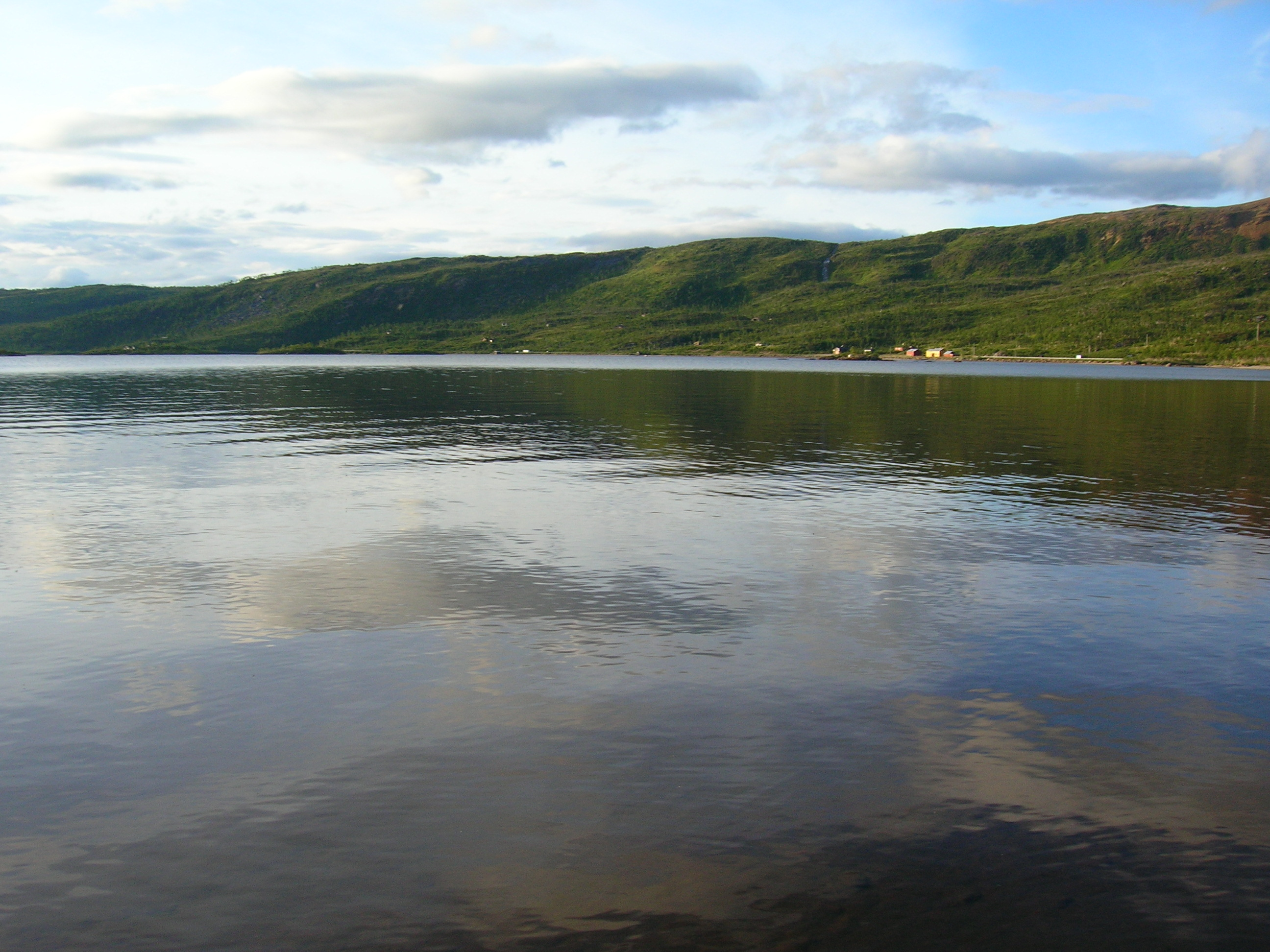
Eastern side

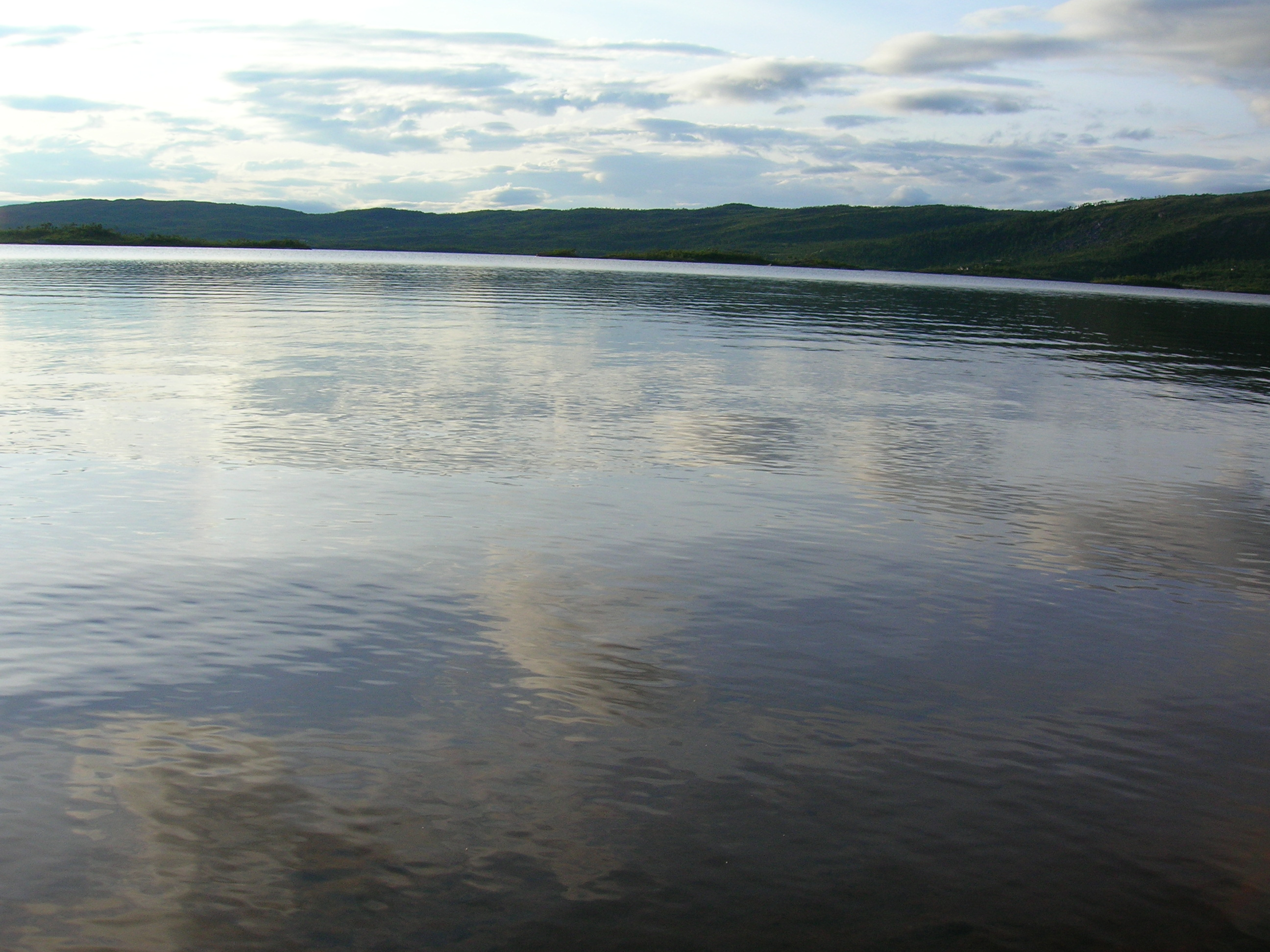
Eastern side

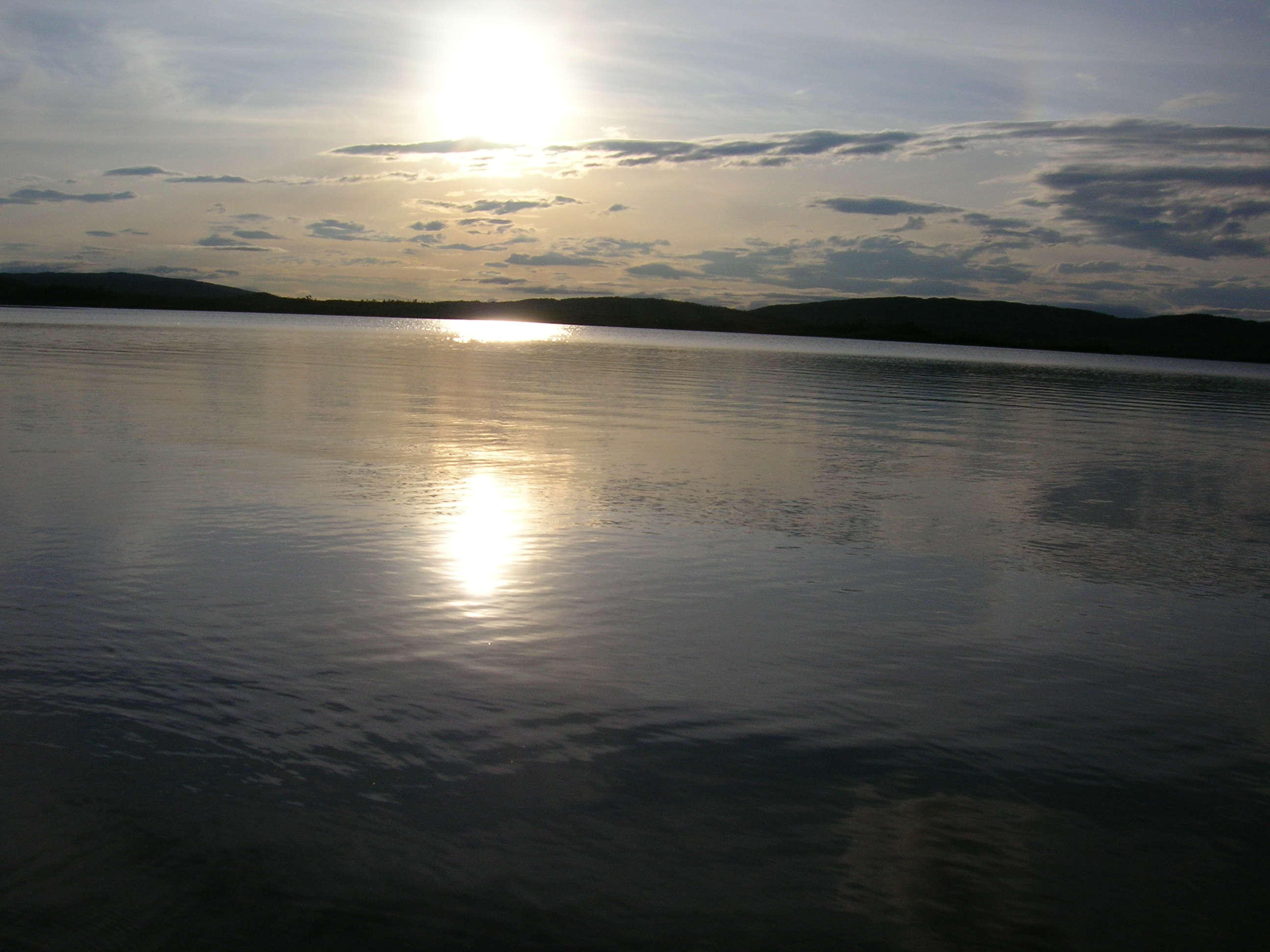
Eastern side

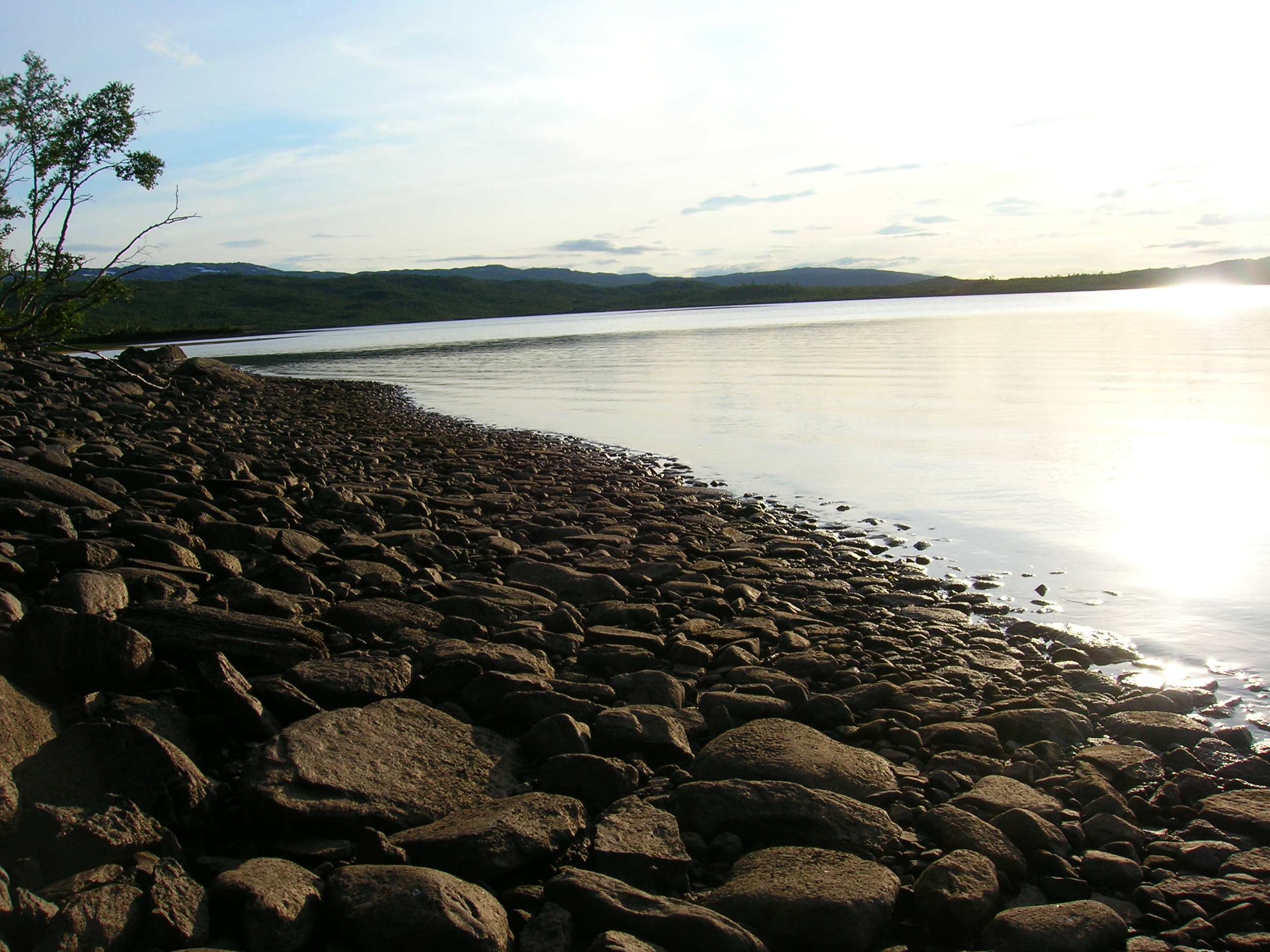
Eastern side

=== Autumn ===
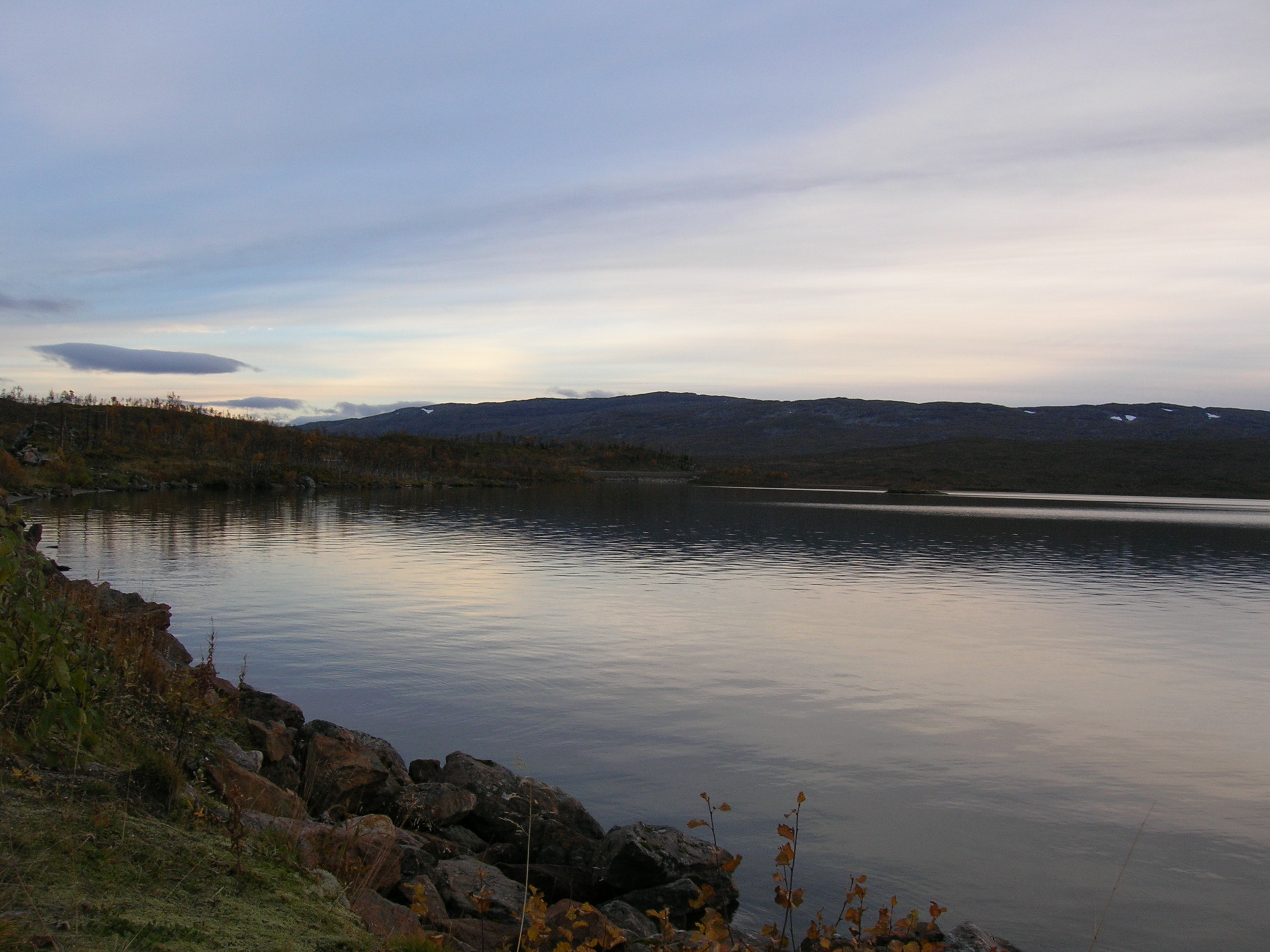
Eastern side

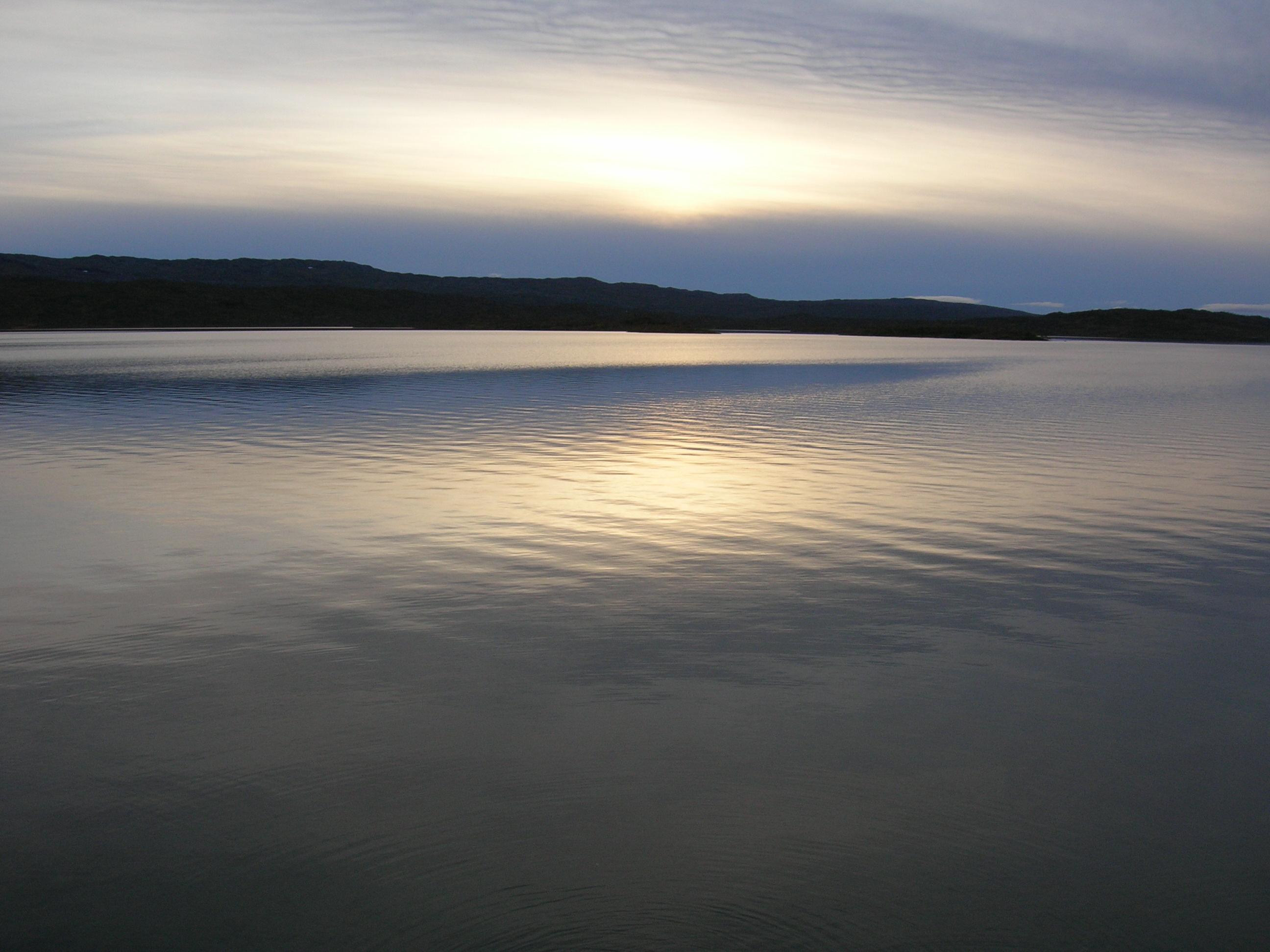
Eastern side

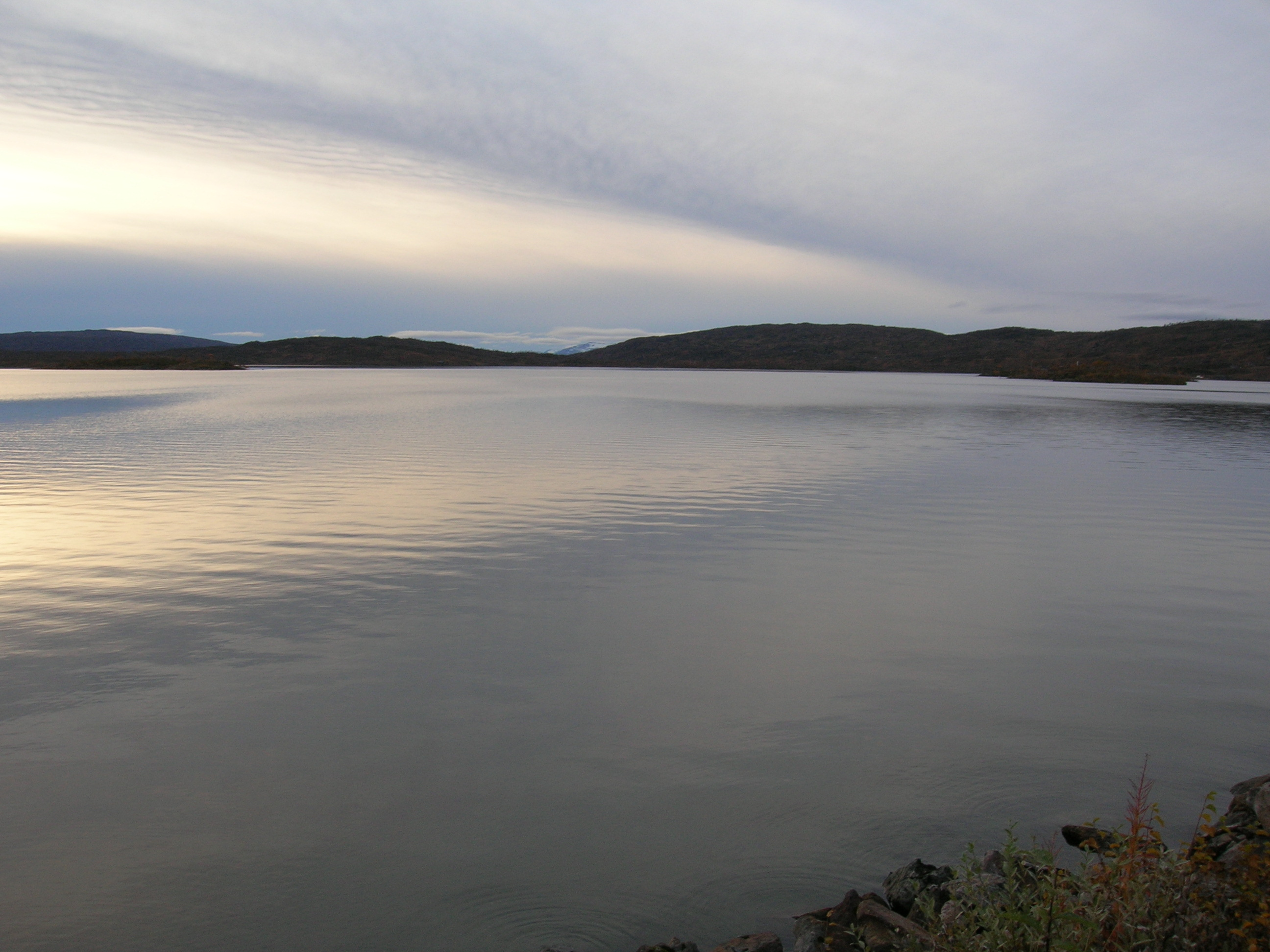
Eastern side

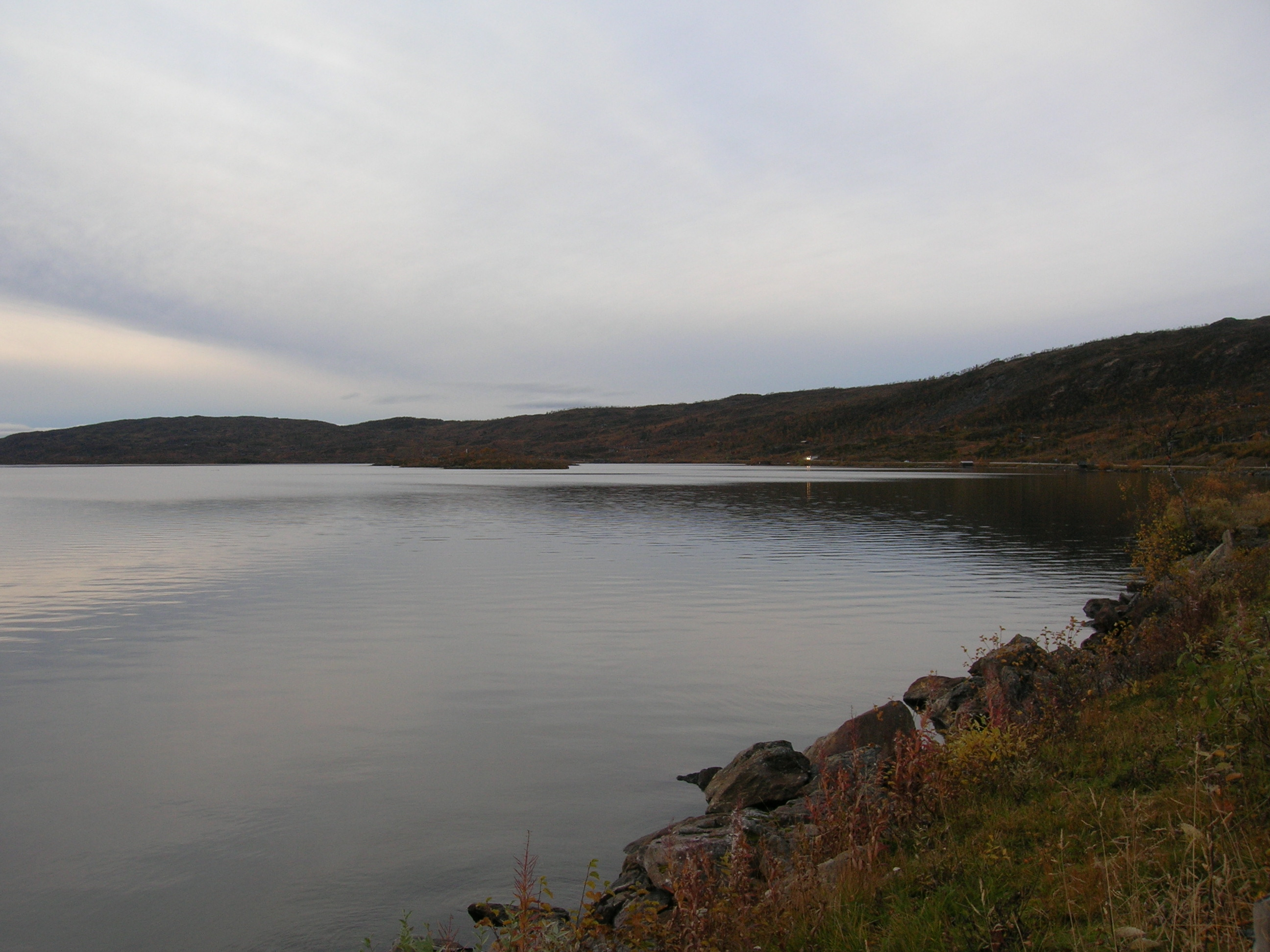
Eastern side

== See also ==
- List of lakes in Norway
- Geography of Norway
