= Tverråga =

River in Nordland, Norway

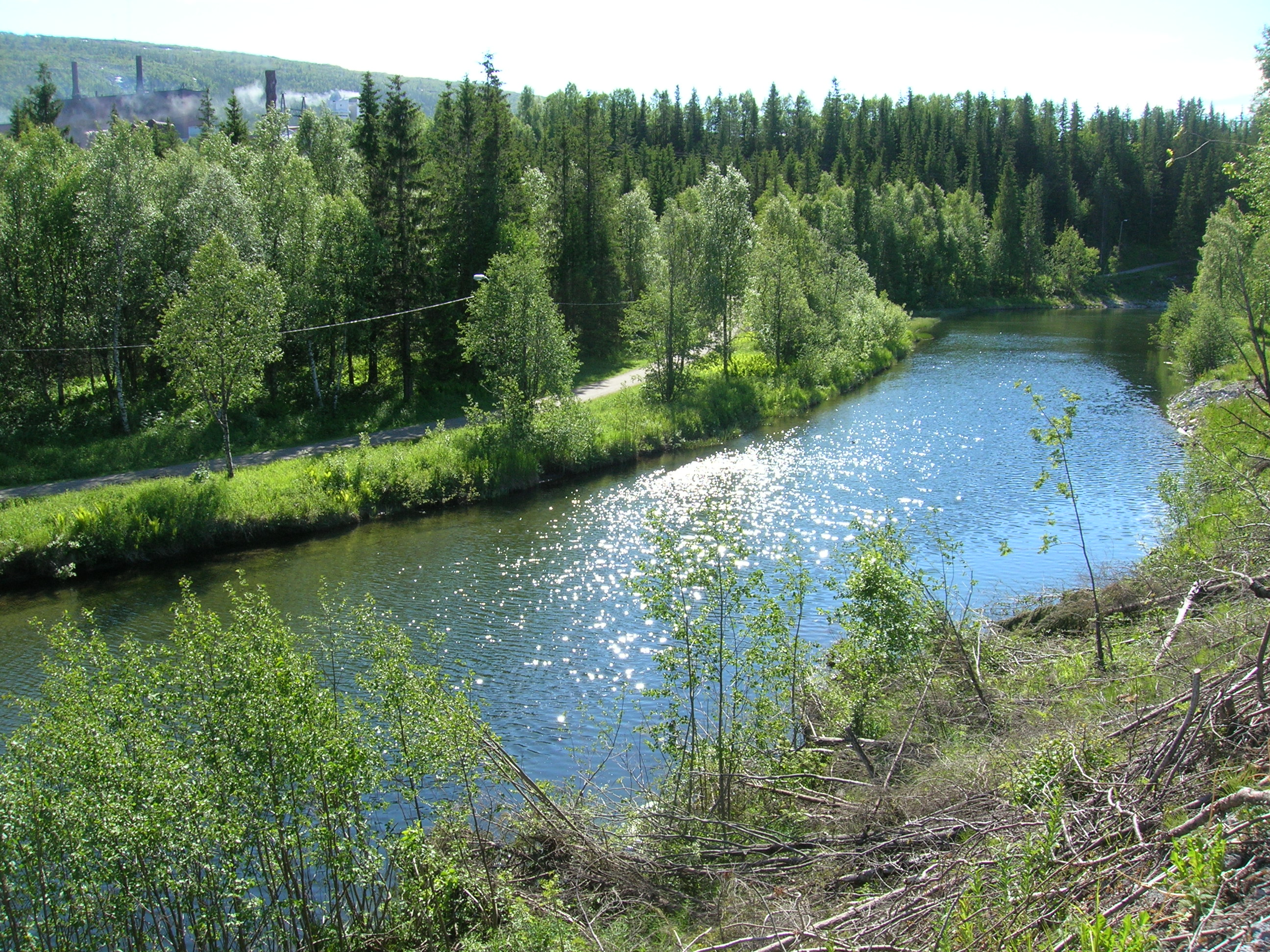
- Tverråga seen from the road to Hammeren
- Interactive map of the river

Location
- Country: Norway
- County: Nordland
- Municipalities: Rana Municipality

Physical characteristics
- Source: Tverrvatnet
  - location: Rana Municipality, Norway
  - coordinates: 66.25424°N 14.54326°E
  - elevation: 501 metres (1,644 ft)
- Mouth: Ranelva
  - location: Mo i Rana, Norway
  - coordinates: 66.32169°N 14.17841°E
  - elevation: 10 metres (33 ft)
- Length: 30 km (19 mi)
- Basin size: 196 km^{2} (76 sq mi)

Basin features
- River system: Ranelva

Tverråga is a river in Rana Municipality in Nordland county, Norway. The river flows from lake Tverrvatnet north until it joins the river Ranelva. The river absorbs seven other rivers during its course, the last one by Hamaren near the village of Gruben.

The Svenskvegen bridge connecting the European route E6 highway to the village of Gruben to the east marks a name change on the bridge. South of the bridge this river is the Tverråga, but the remaining section of the river to the north of the bridge is called the river Revelelva. The 800-metre (2,600 ft) long Revelelva then flows into the river Ranelva.

== Media gallery ==
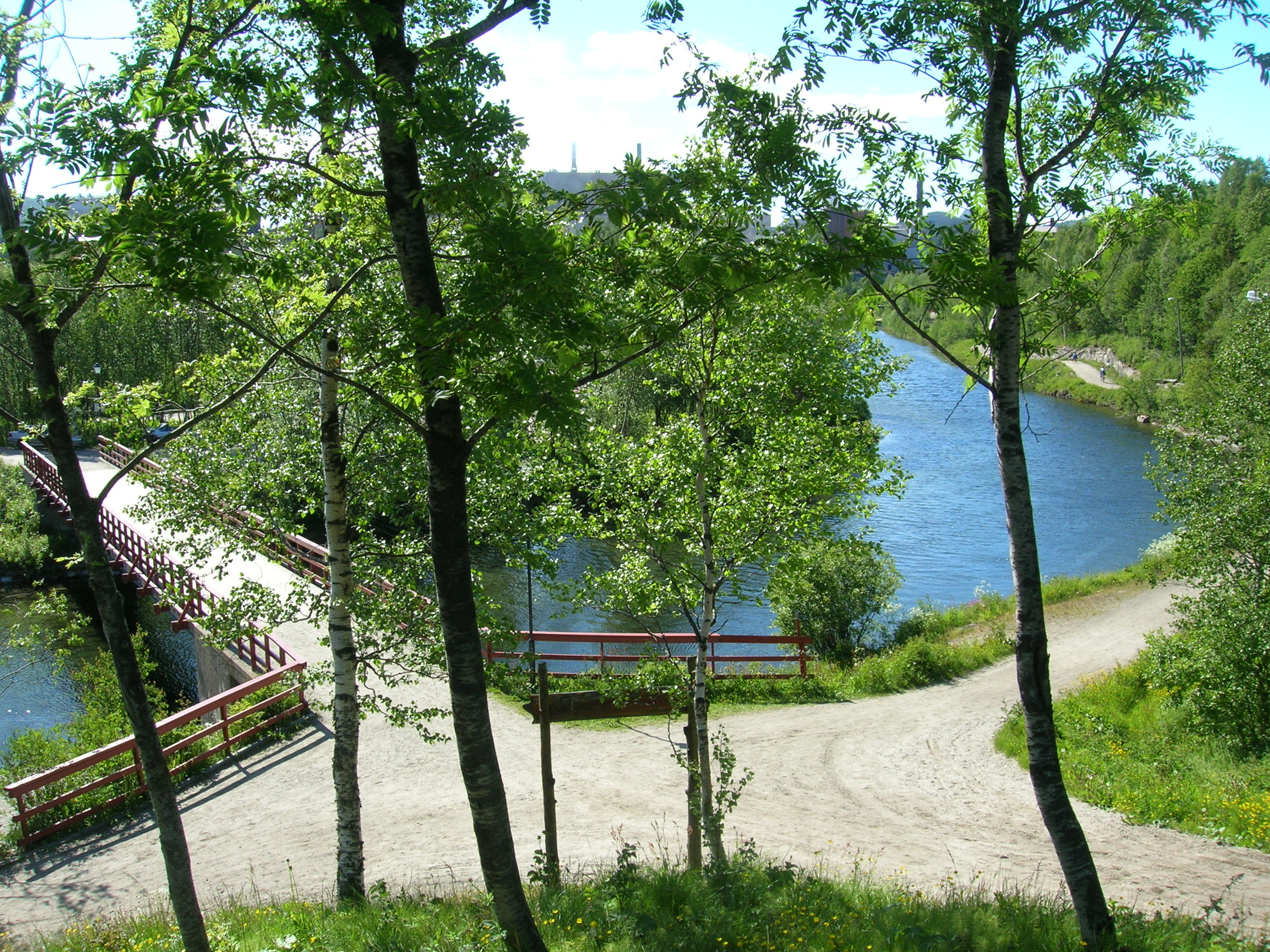
Tverråga seen from Klokkerhagen

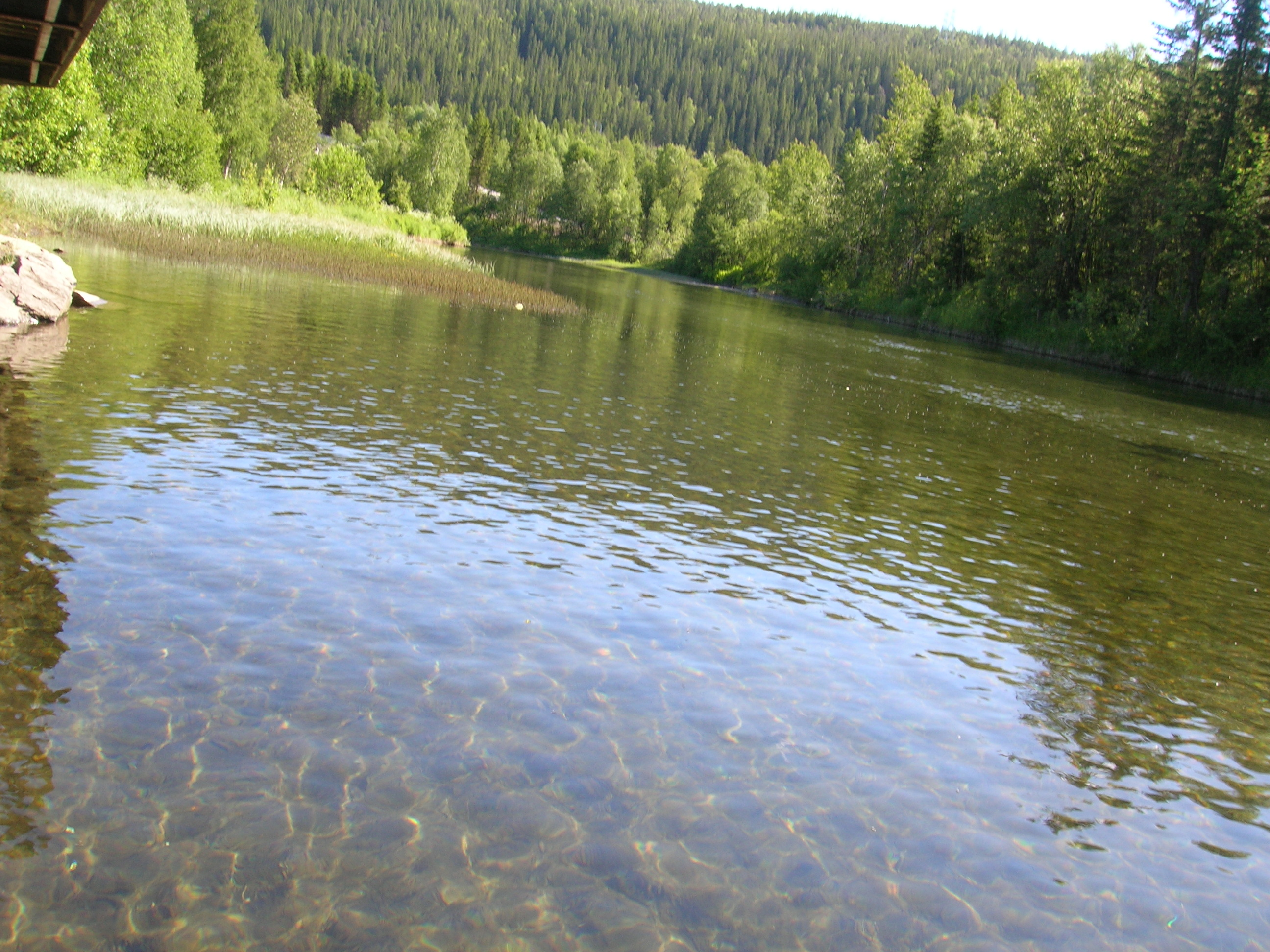
Tverråga seen from Klokkerhagen

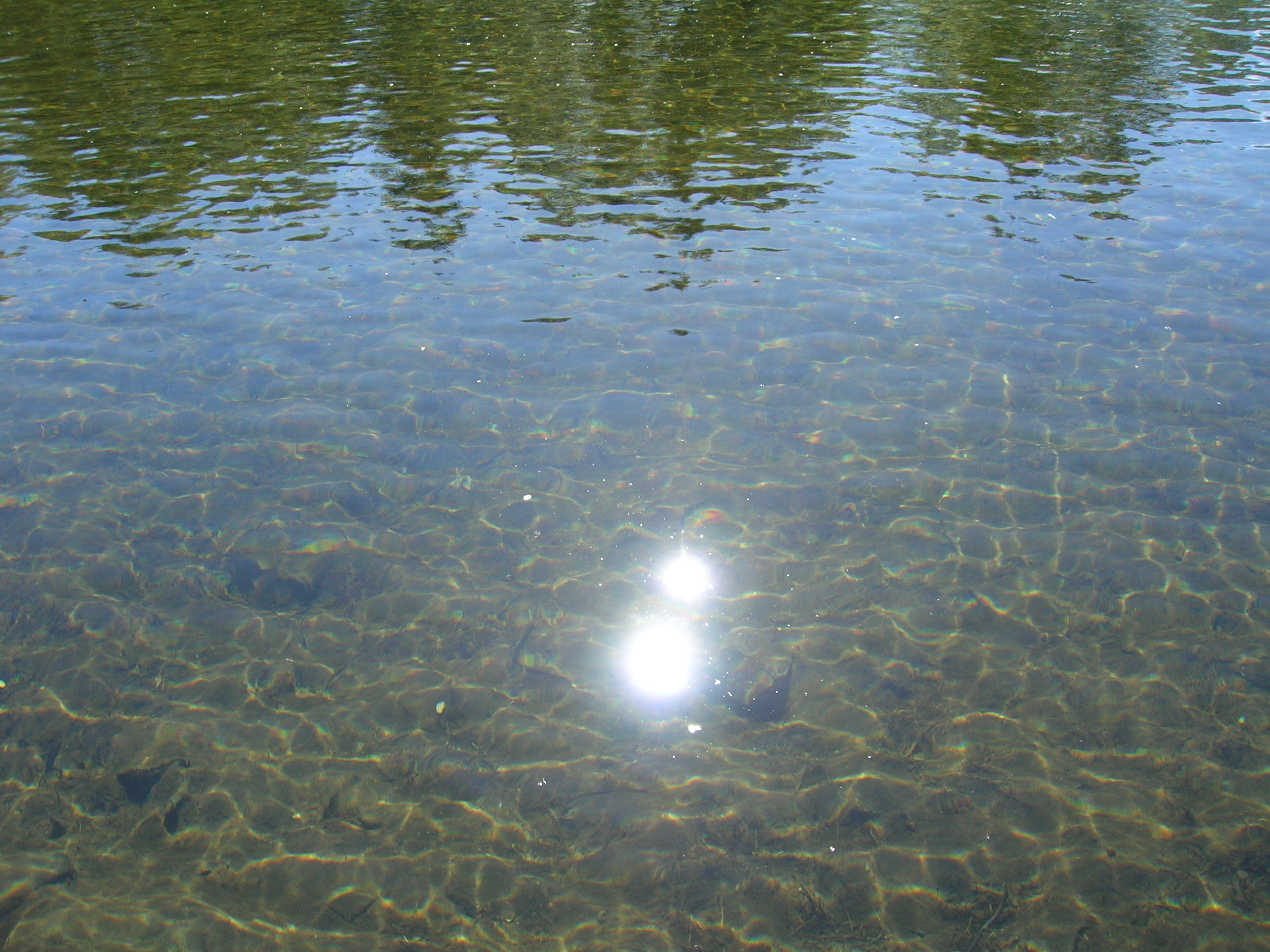
Tverråga seen from Klokkerhagen

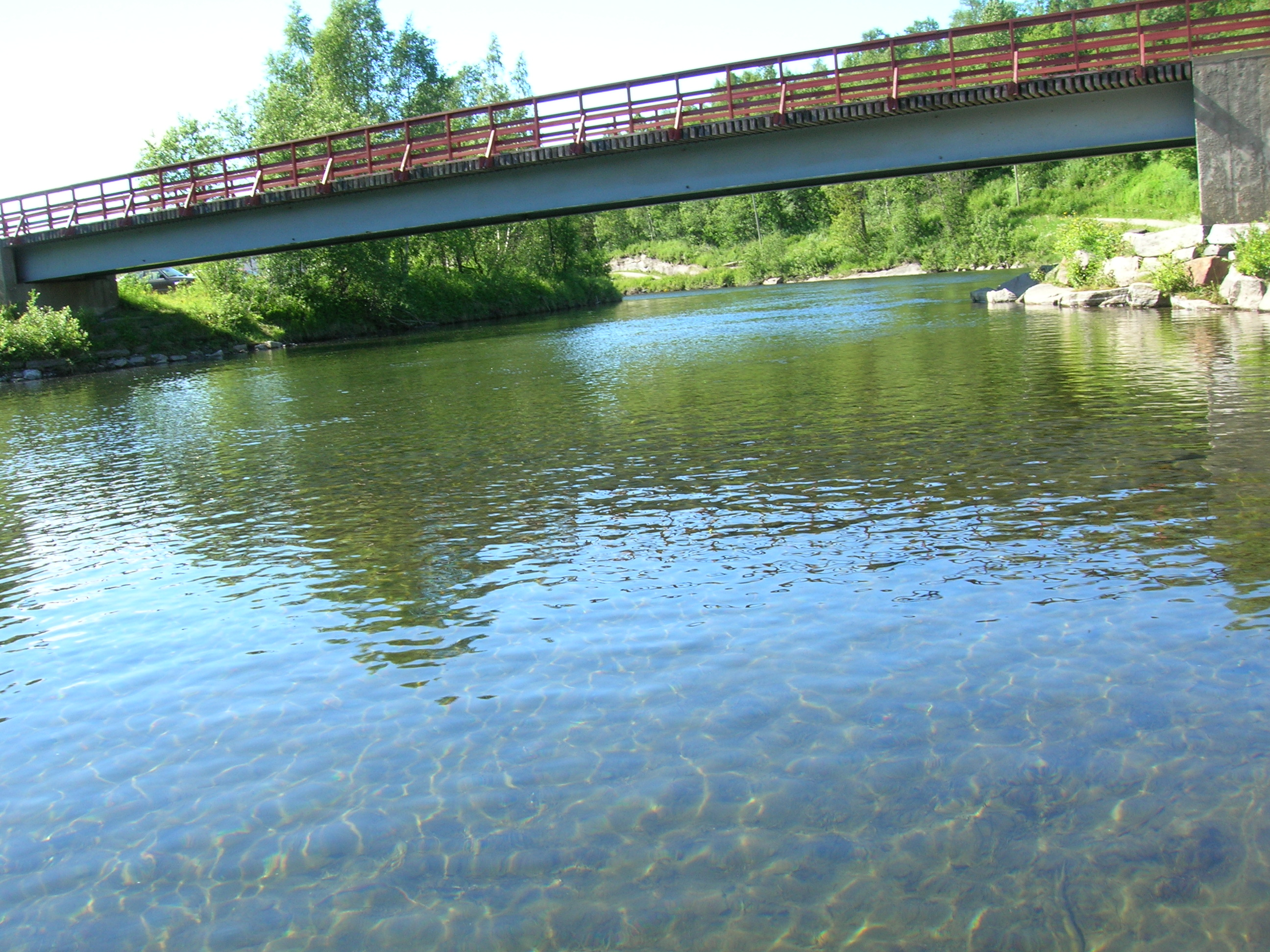
Tverråga seen from Klokkerhagen

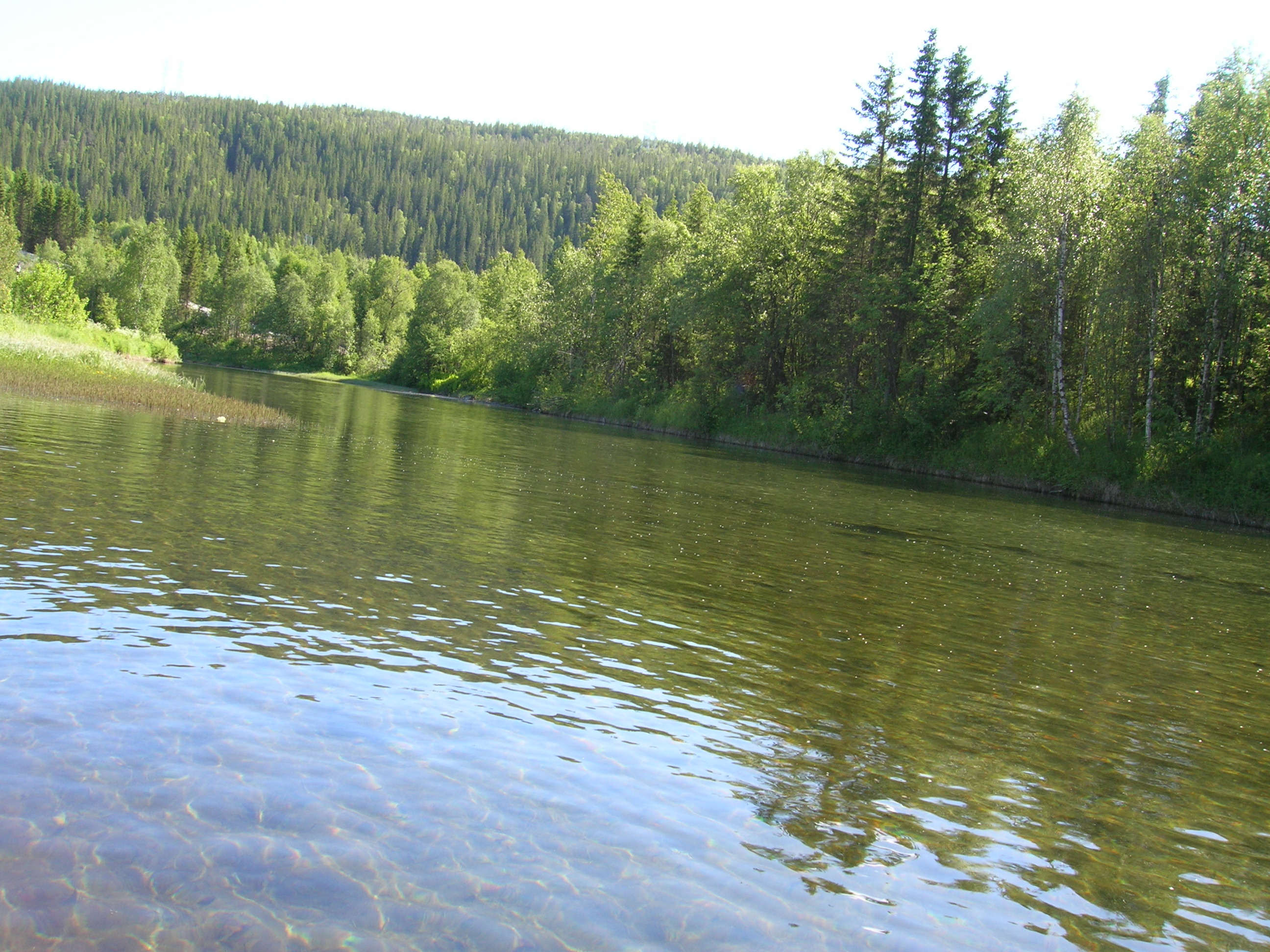
Tverråga seen from Klokkerhagen

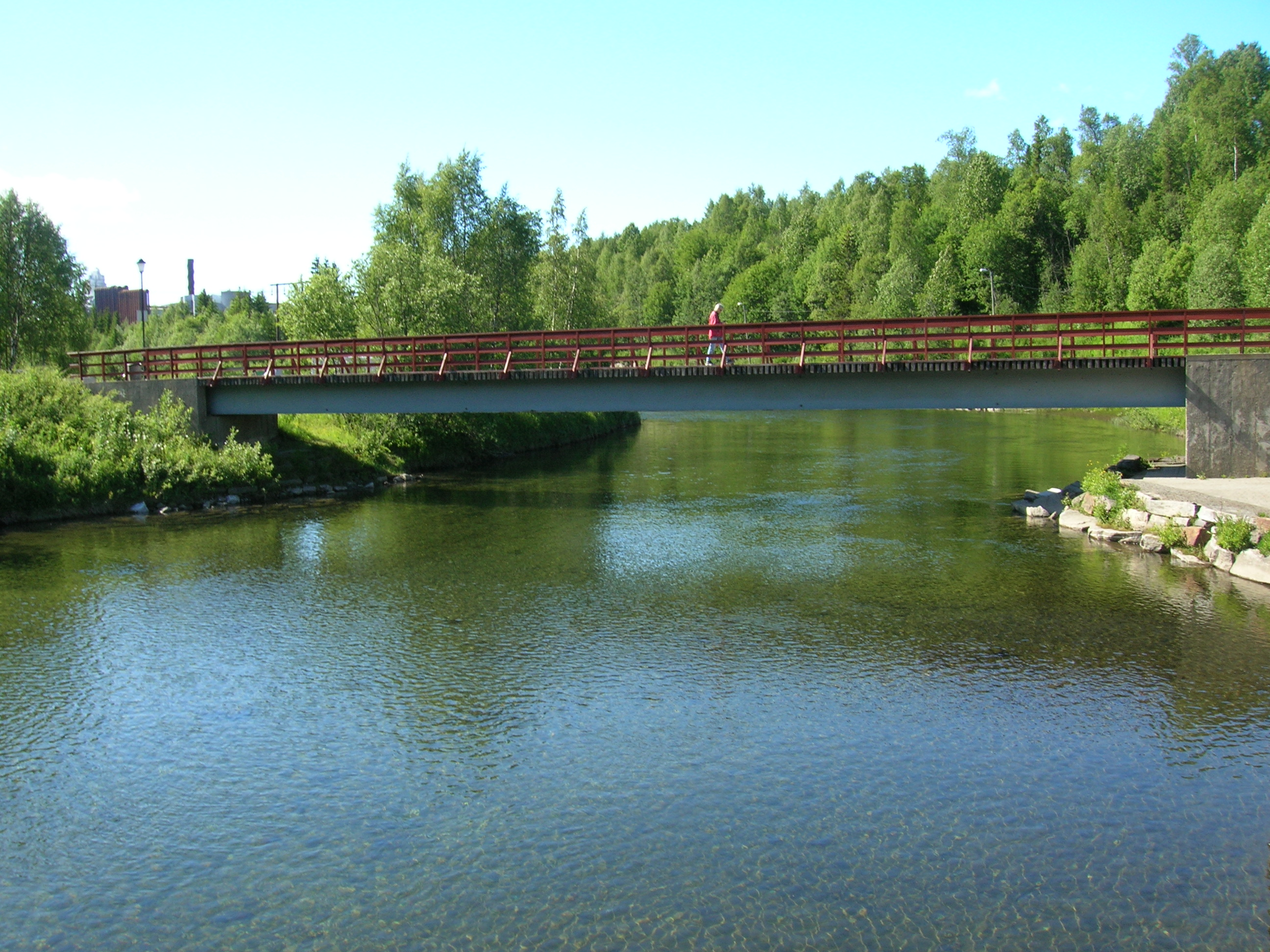
Tverråga seen from Klokkerhagen

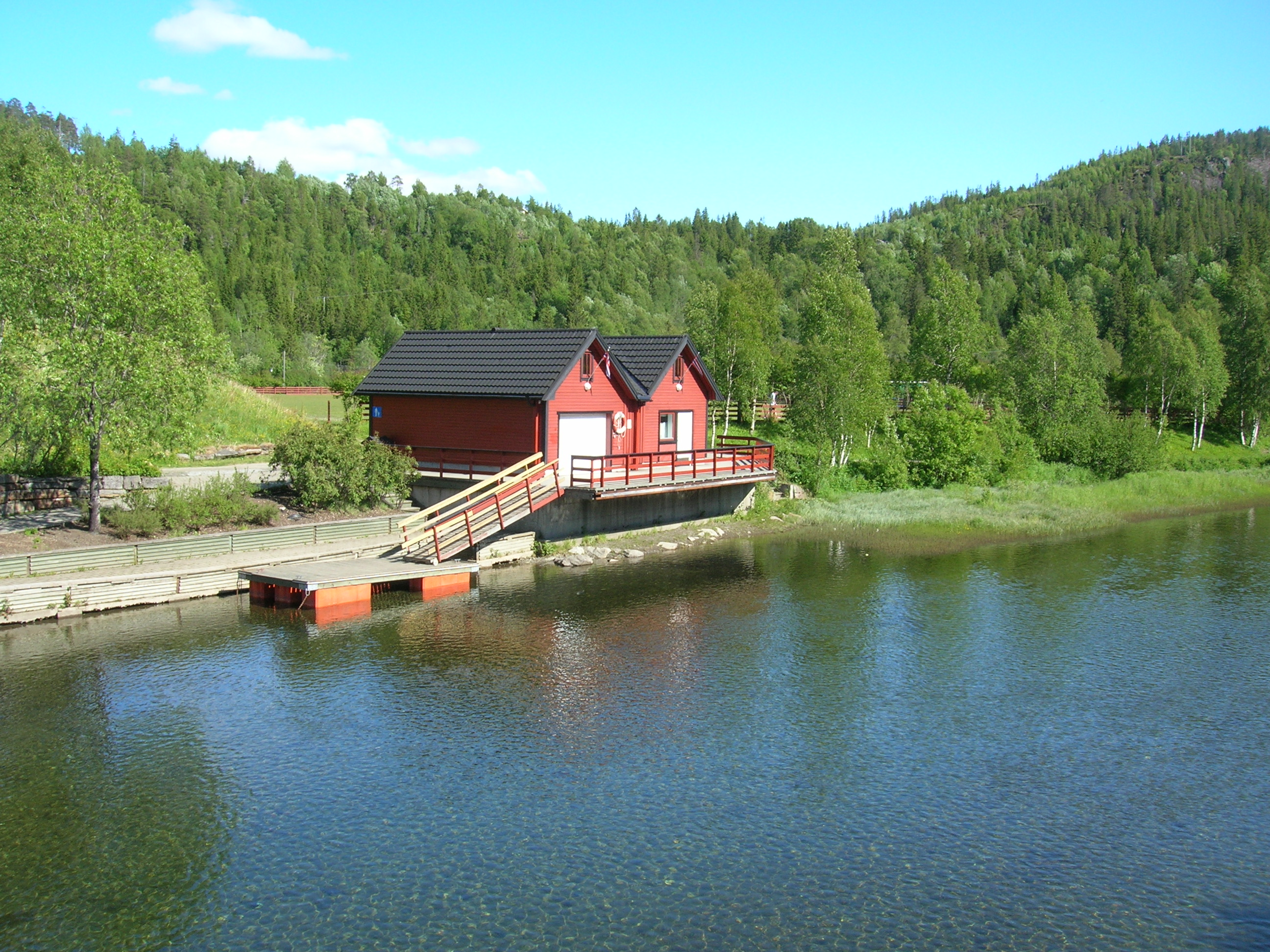
Tverråga seen from Klokkerhagen

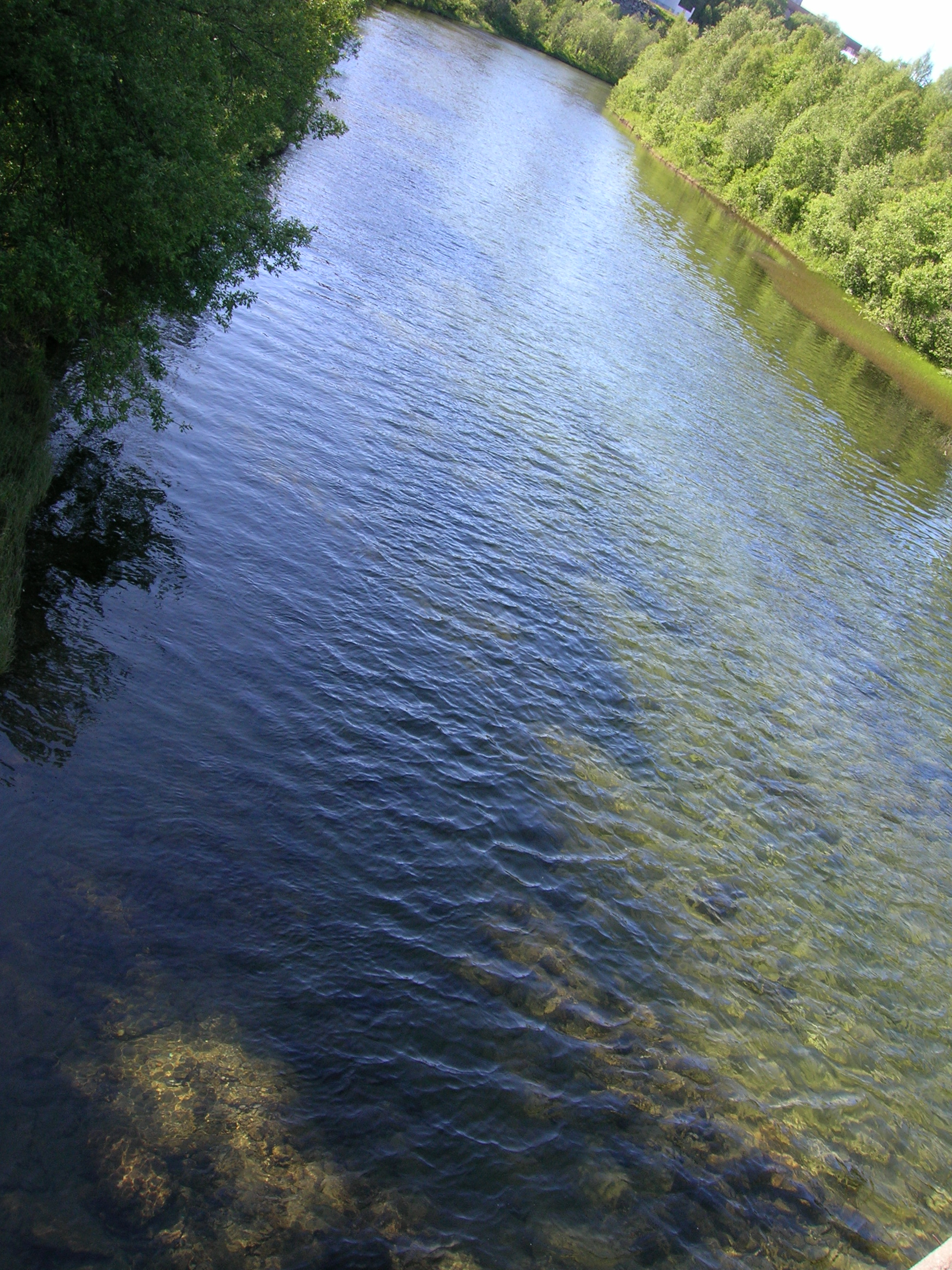
Tverråga (bridge before Klokkerhagen)

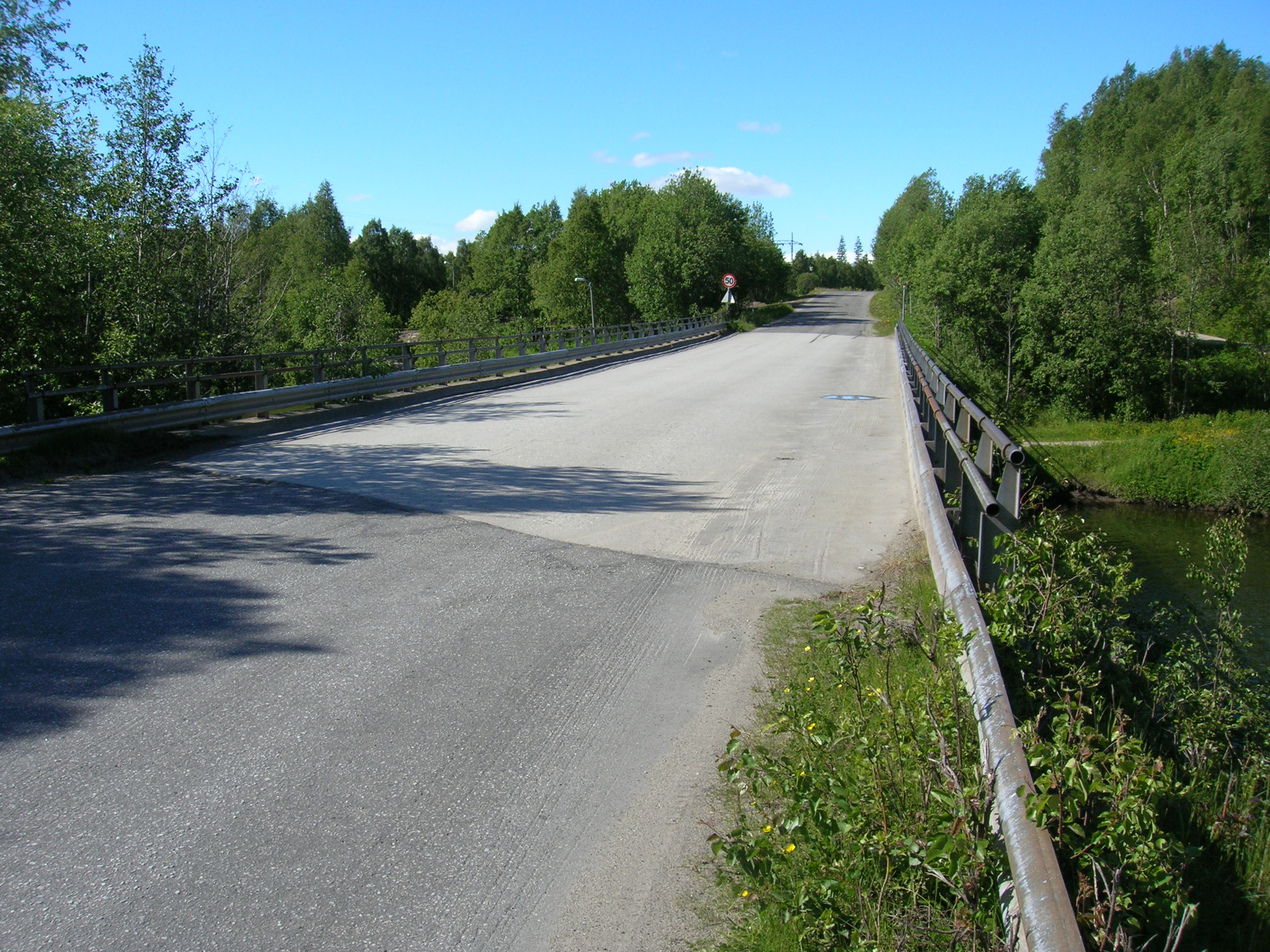
Bridge before Klokkerhagen

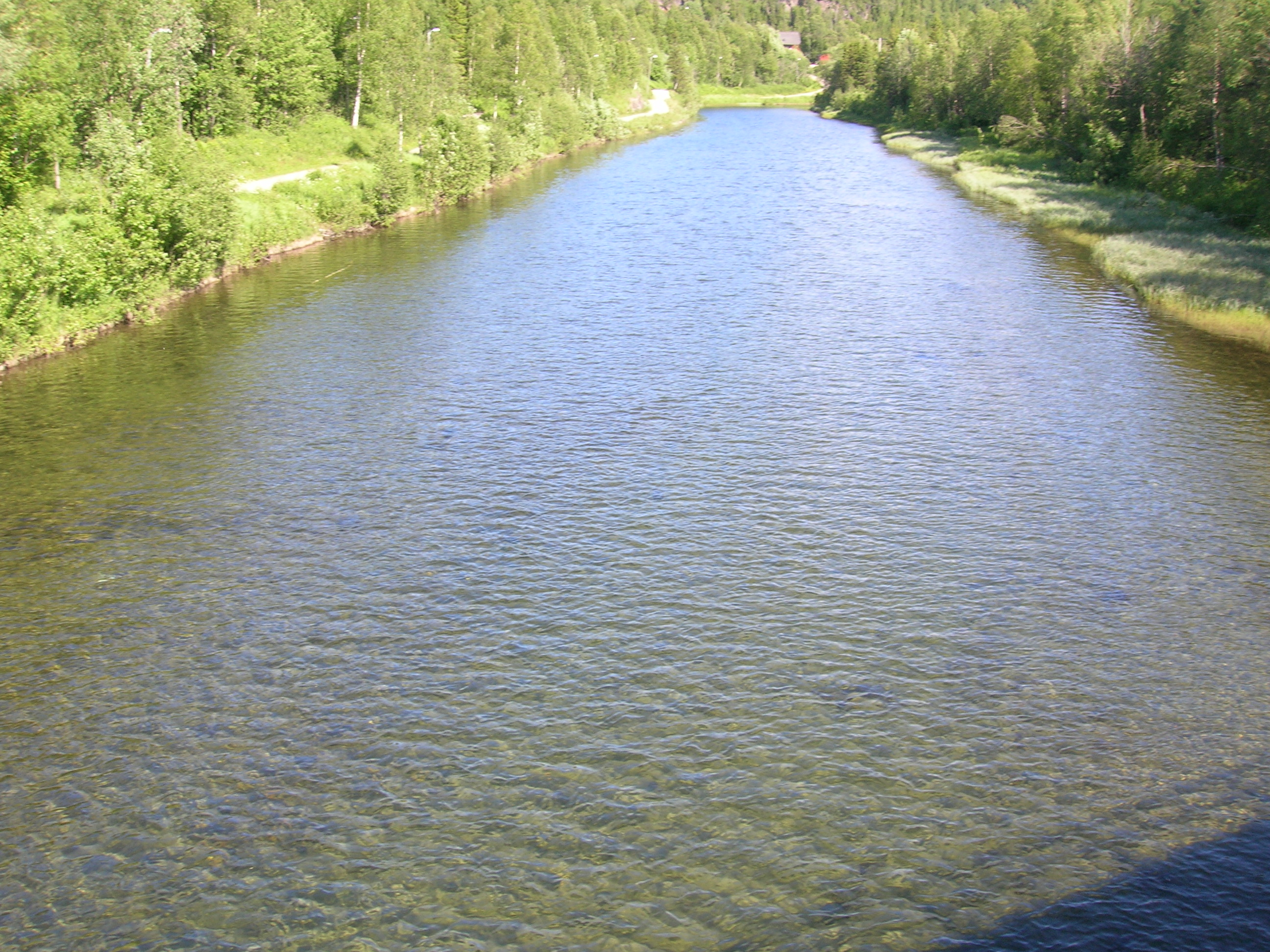
Tverråga (bridge before Klokkerhagen)

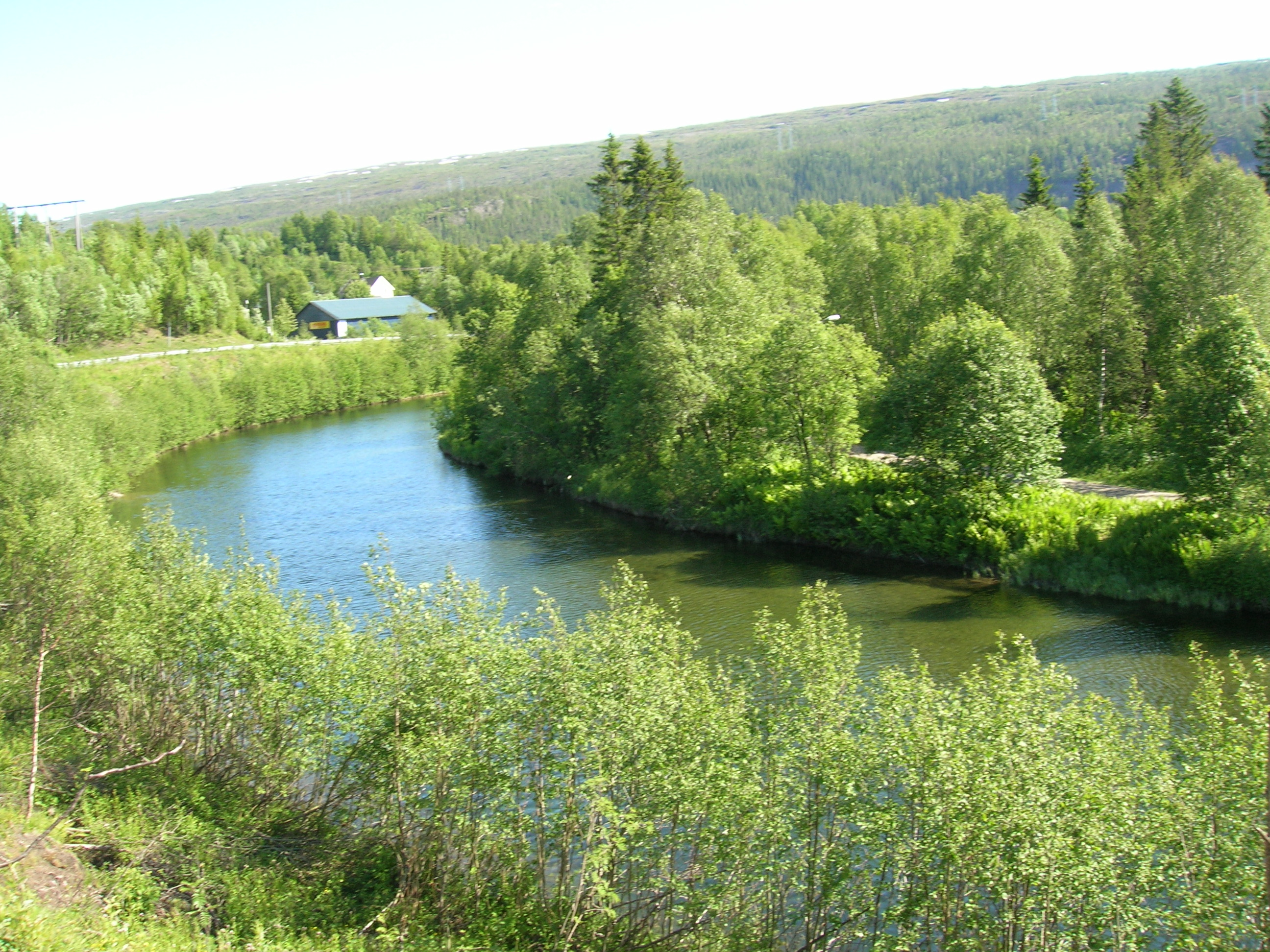
Tverråga seen from the road to Hammeren

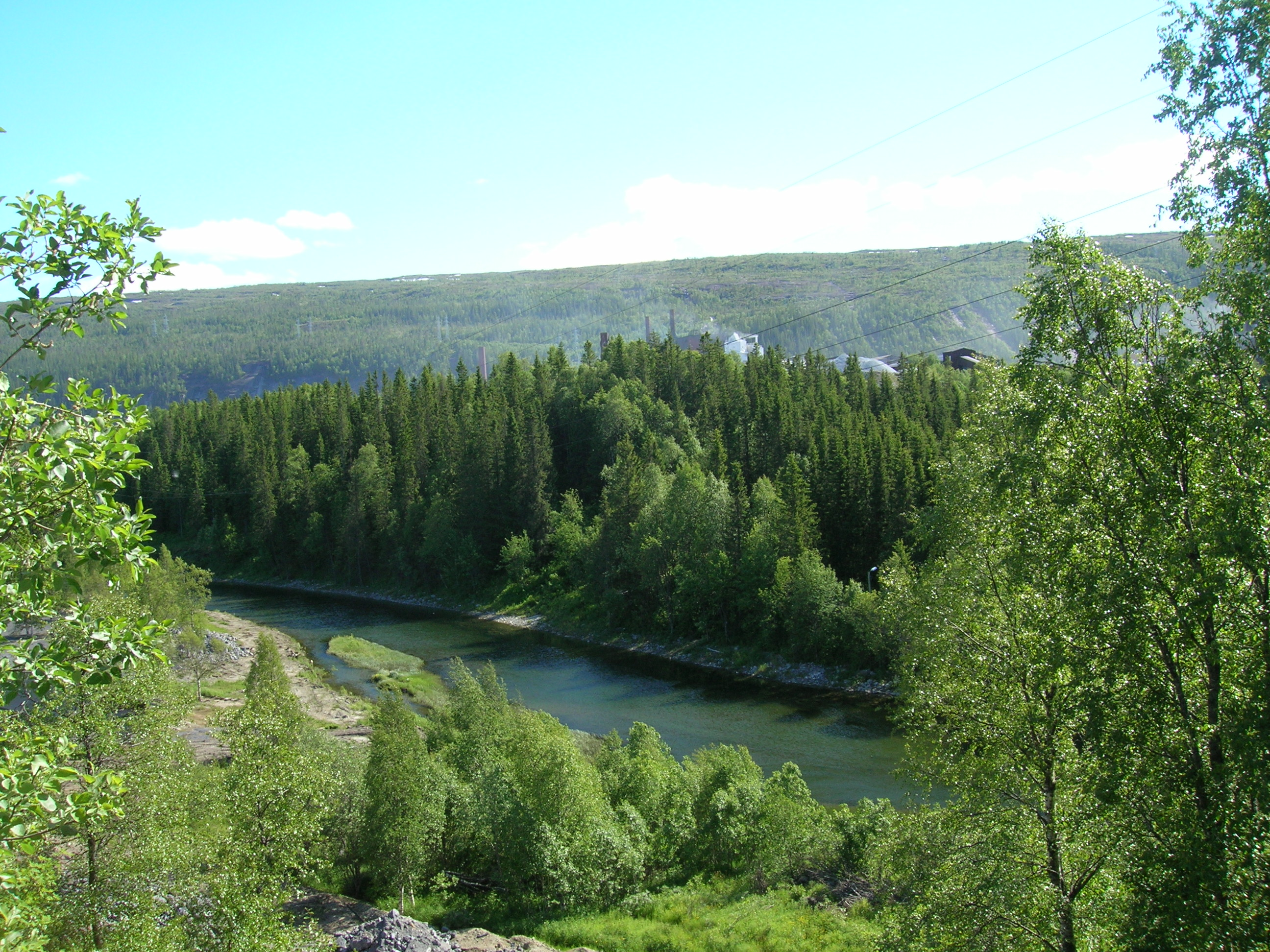
Tverråga seen from Svenskveien between E6 and Gruben

== See also ==
- List of rivers in Norway
