= Revelelva =

River in Nordland, Norway

Revelelva or Revelåga is the local name of the lowest part of the river Tverråga, which has its outlet in the larger river Ranelva in Rana Municipality in Nordland county, Norway. The river changes its name at the bridge connecting European route E6 with Gruben. Before this bridge it is called Tverråga. Passing this bridge, it is called Revelelva.

== Media gallery ==
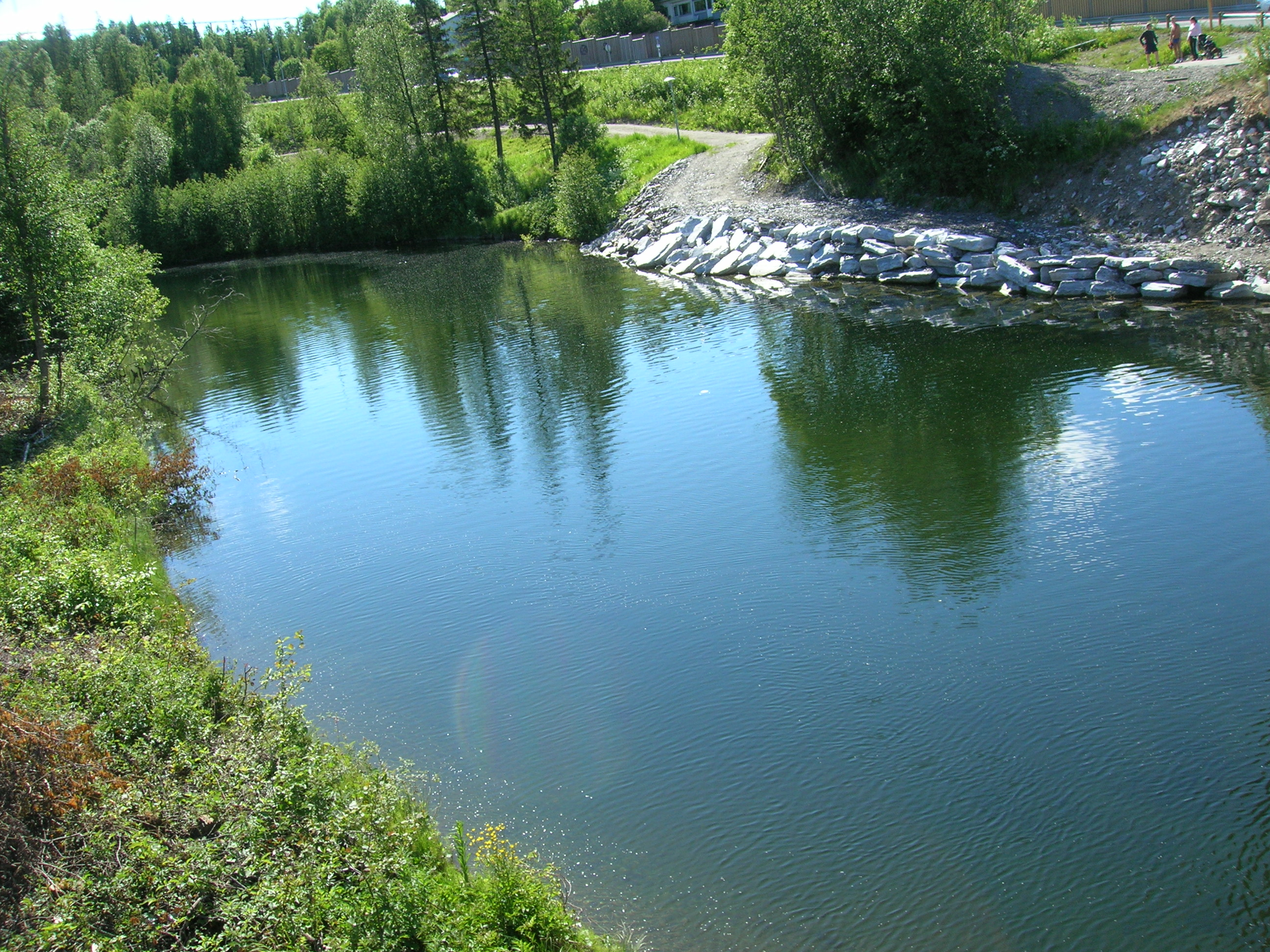
Before the bridge the river is called Tverråga

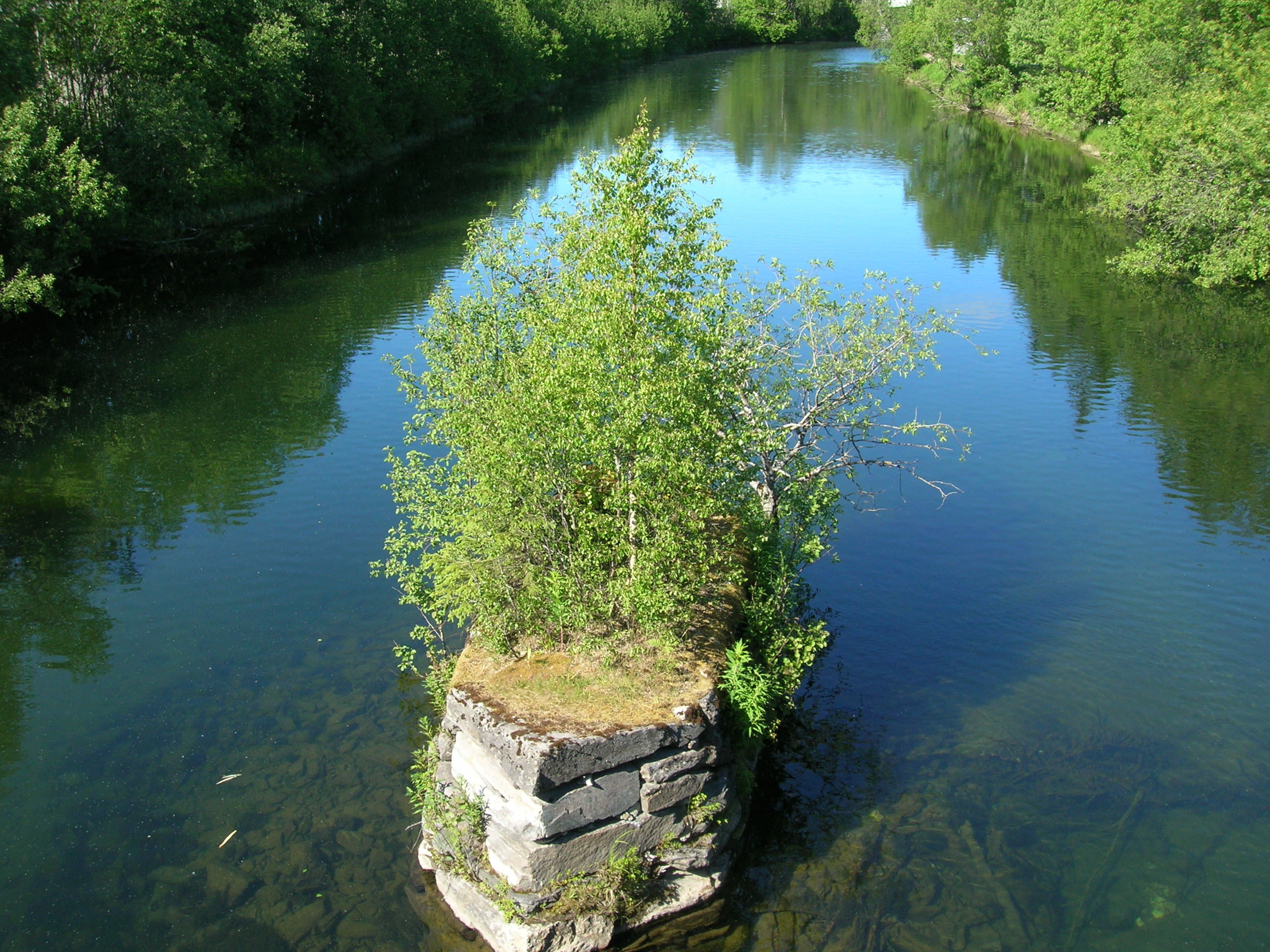
After the bridge the river is called Revelelva

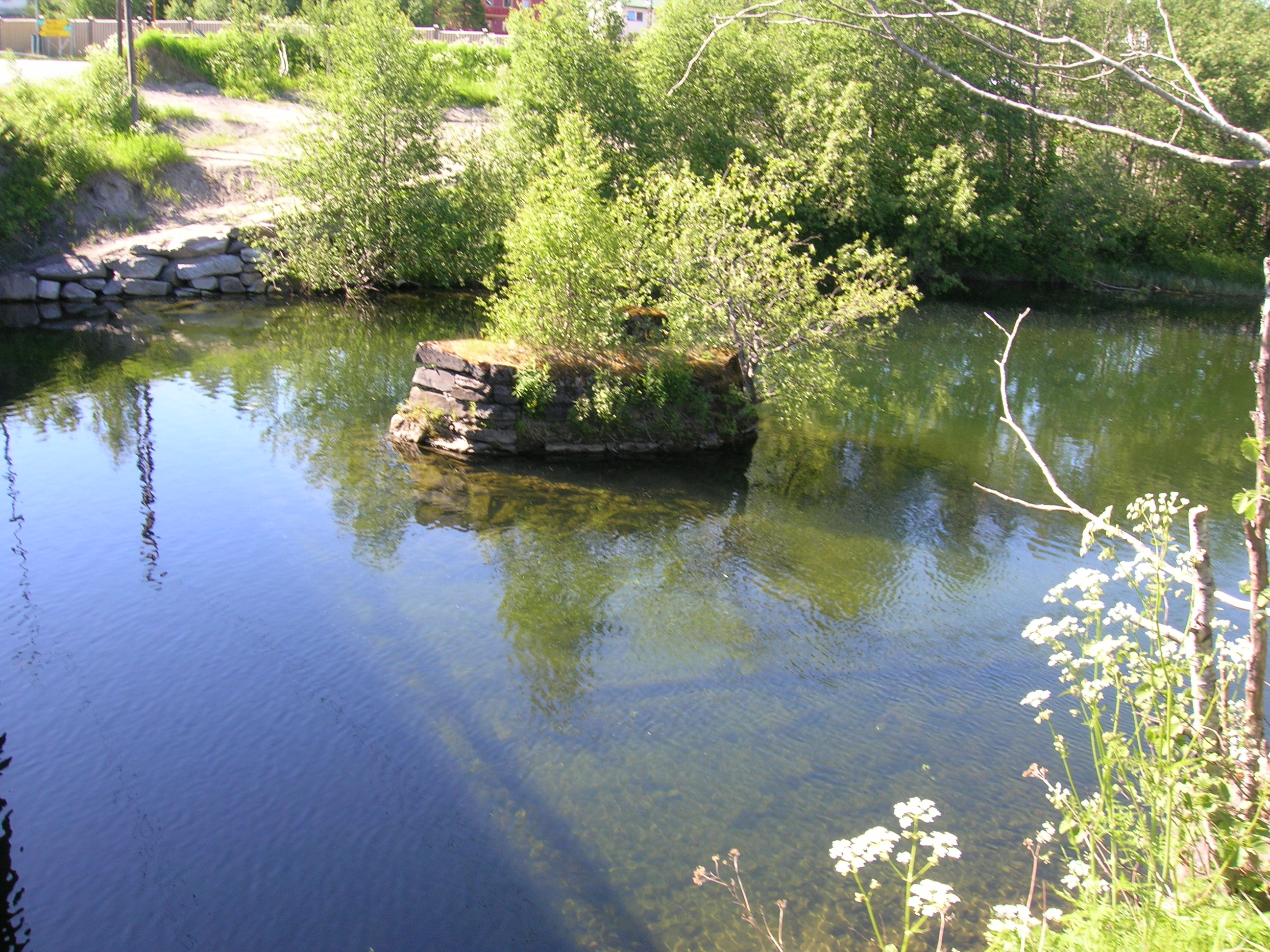
After the bridge the river is called Revelelva

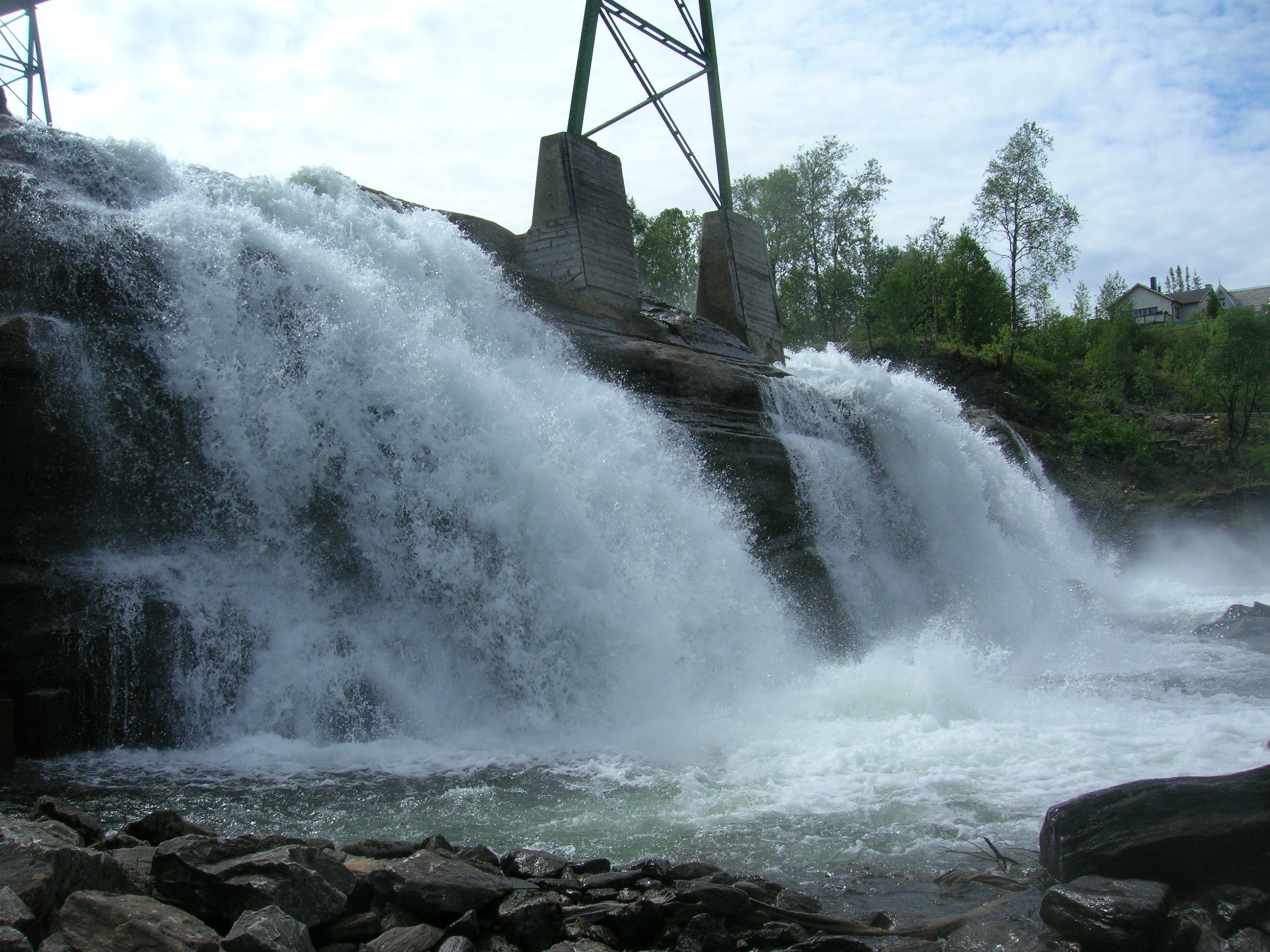
The waterfall Revelfossen

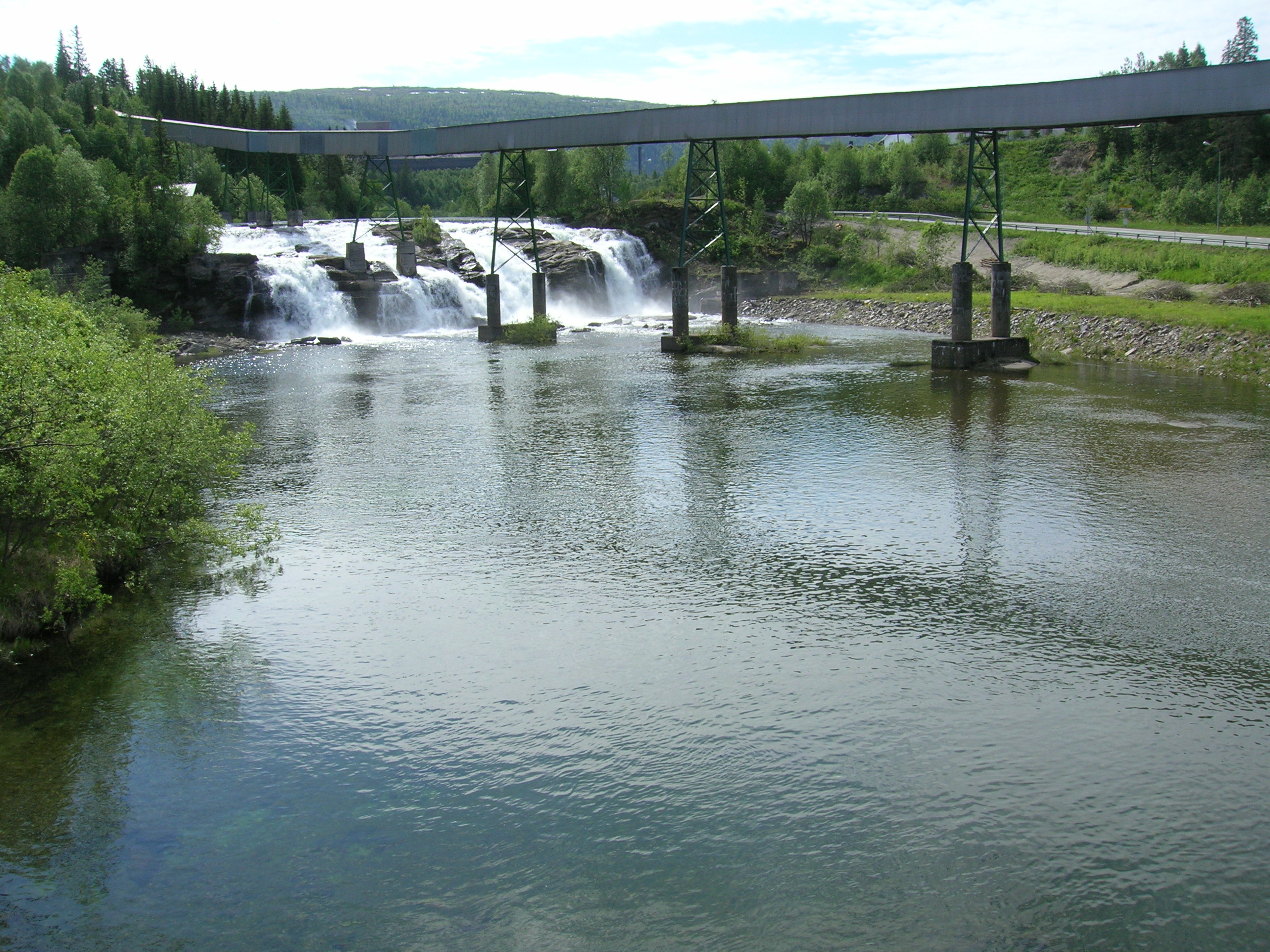
The waterfall Revelfossen

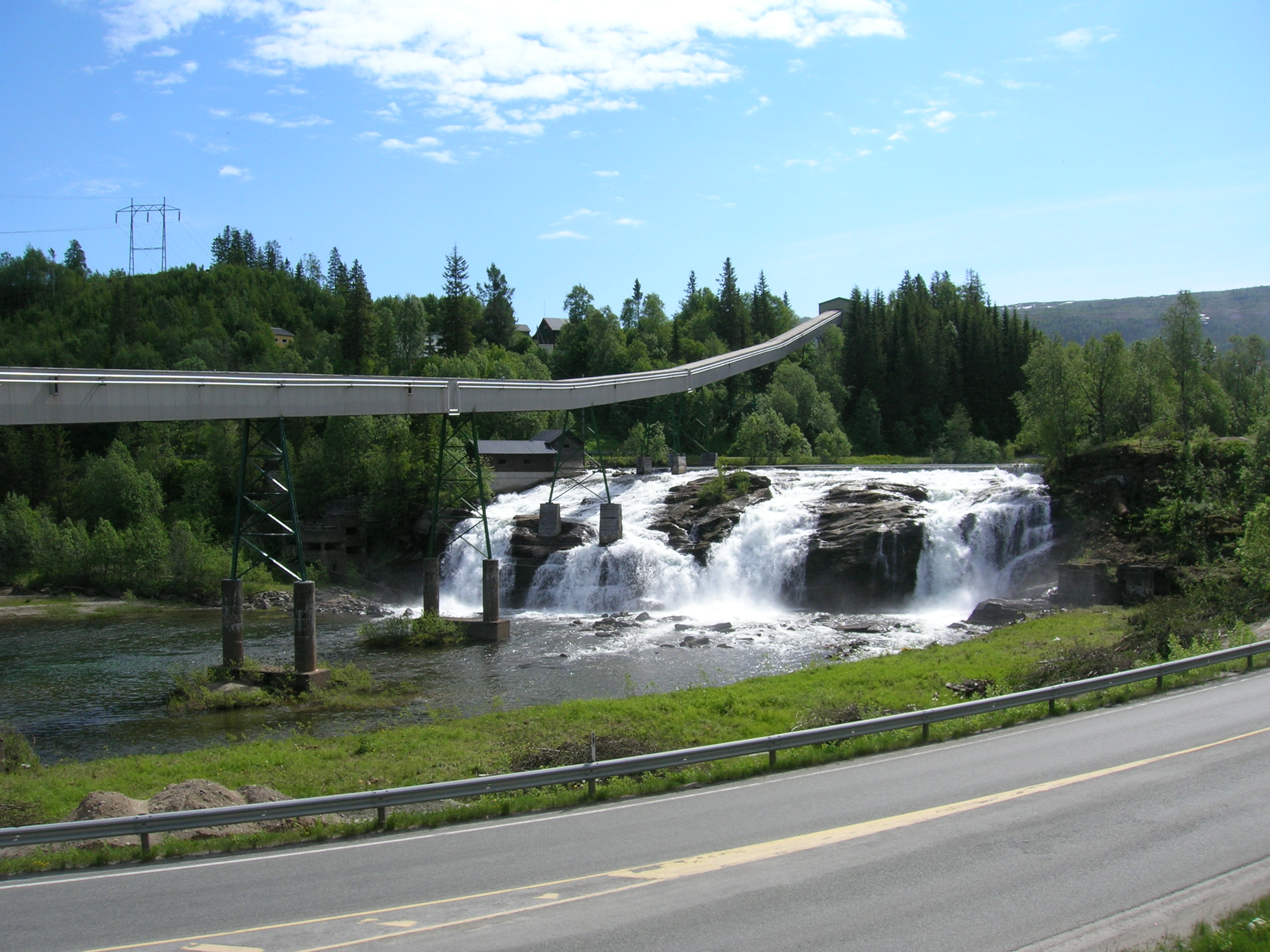
The waterfall Revelfossen

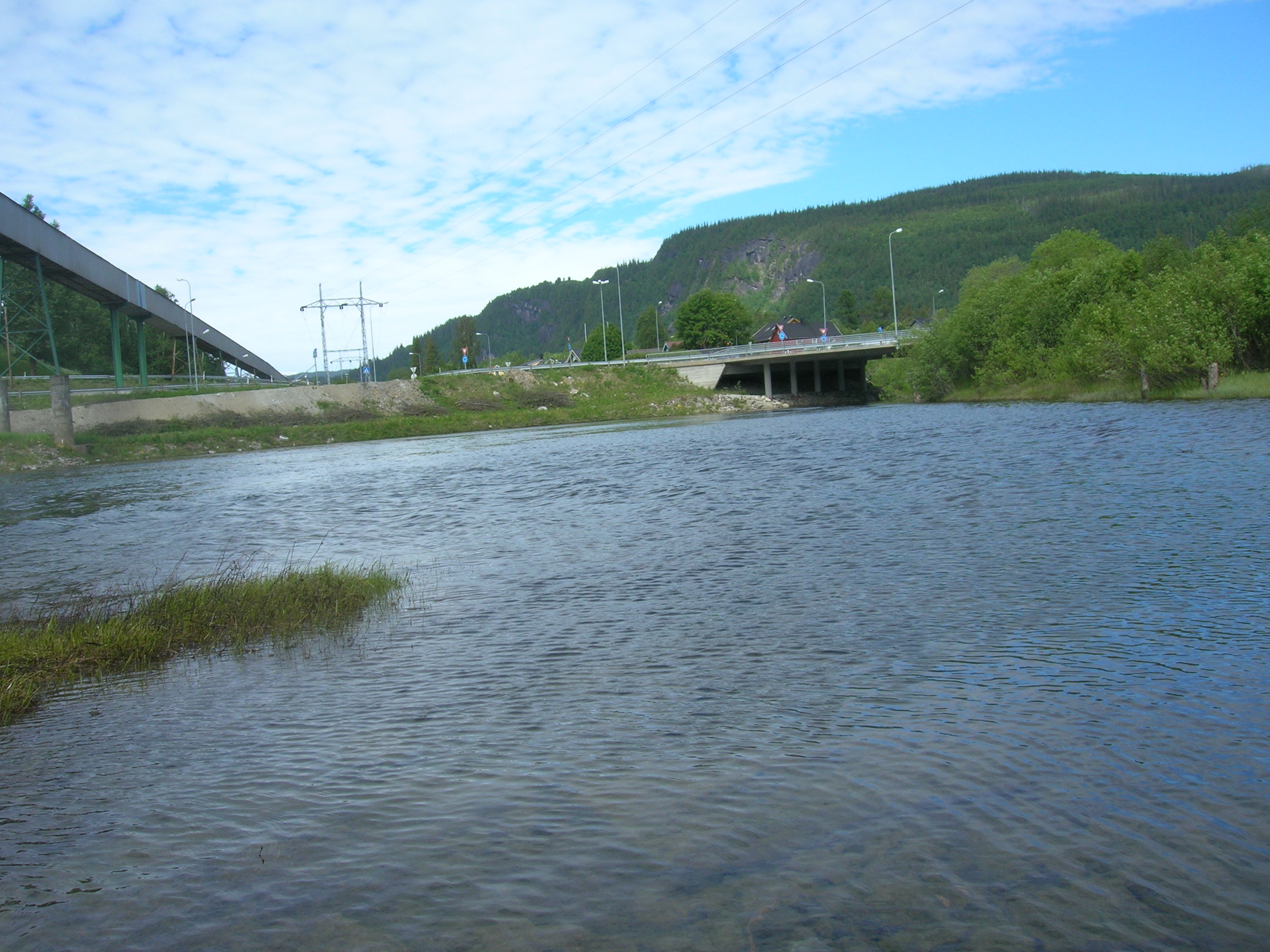
The further flow, seen from Revelfossen

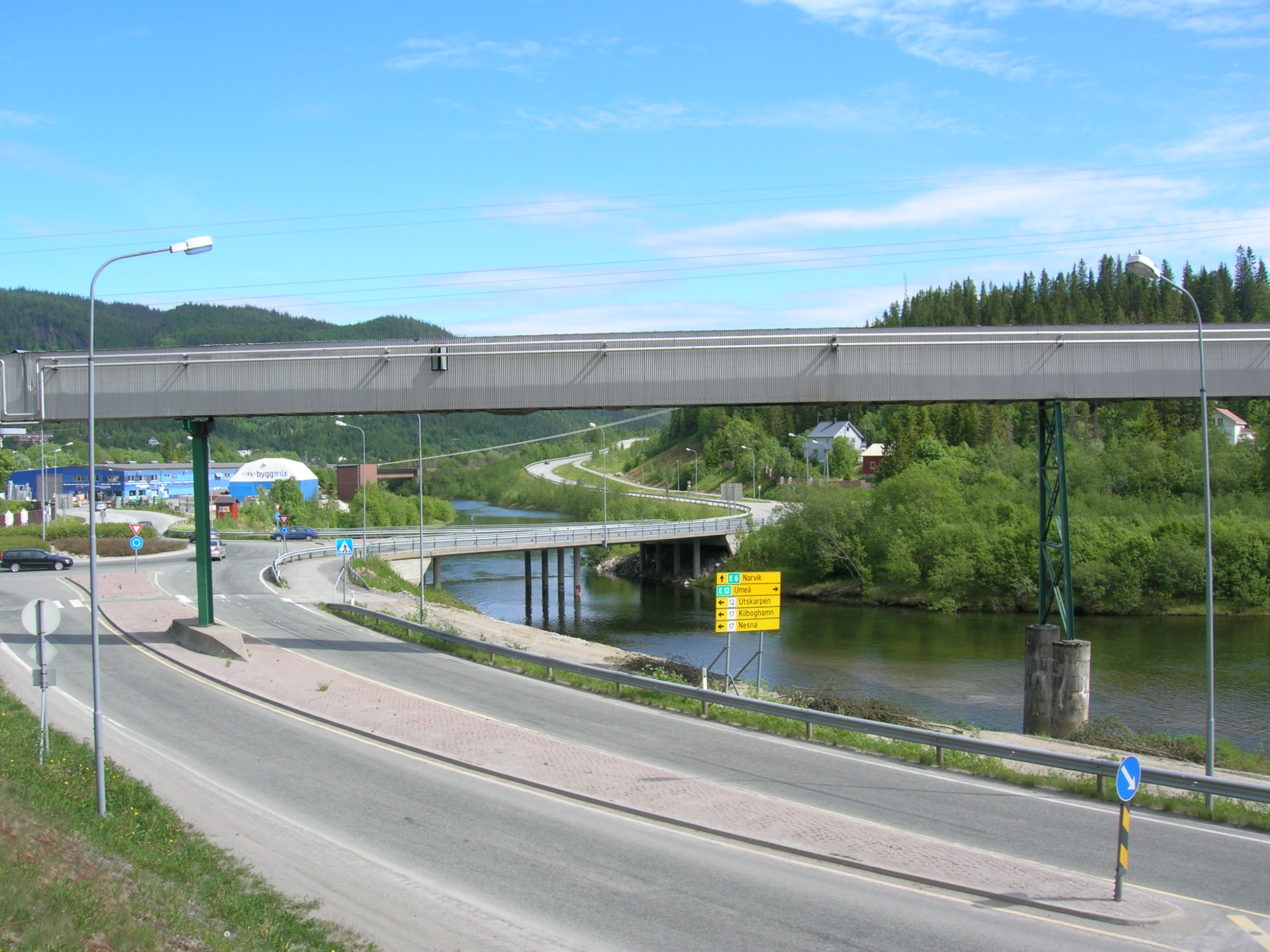
Revelelva on right side of the E6, continuing on right side under the bridge of E12 towards Sweden

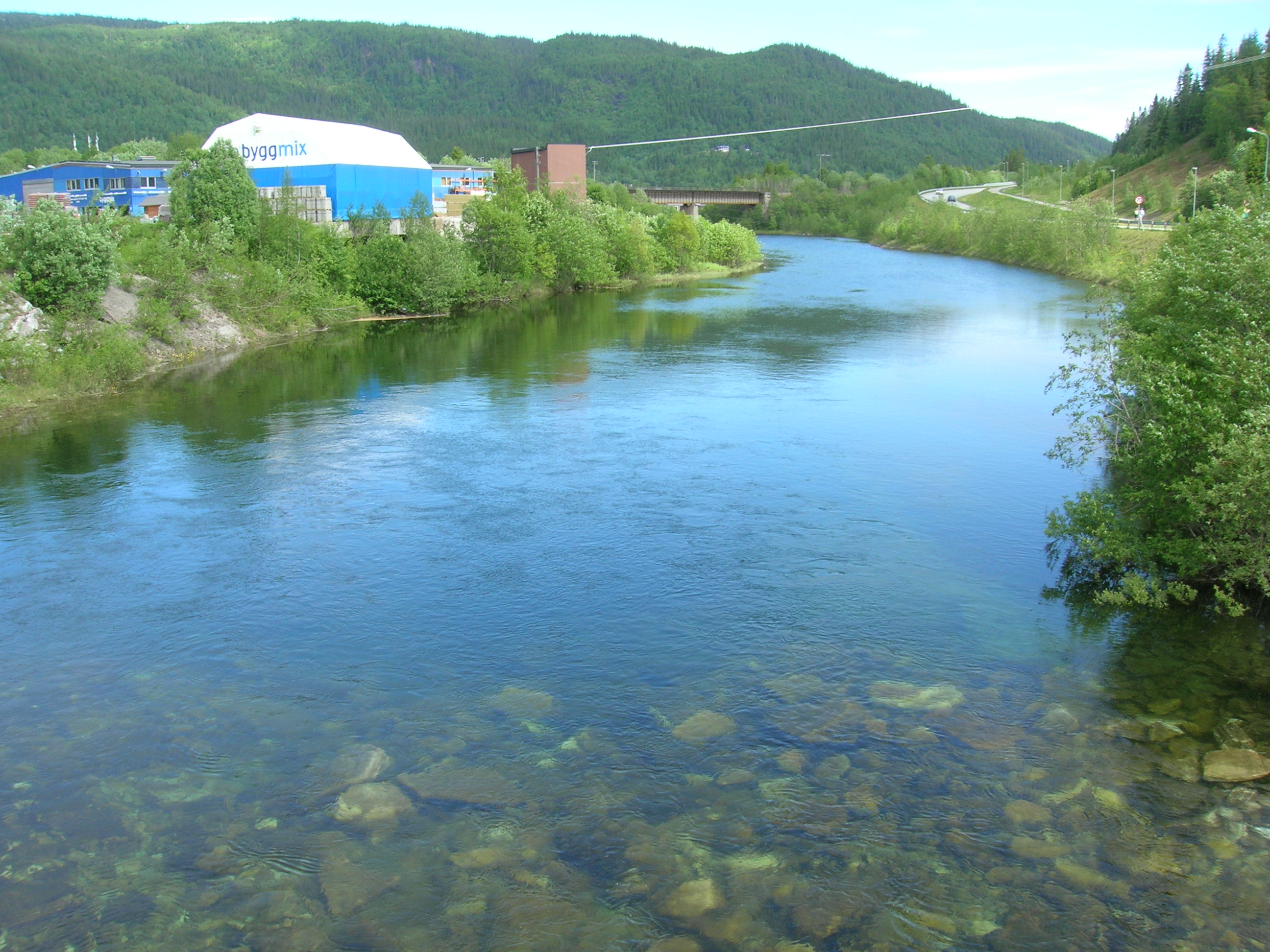
Revelelva seen from the bridge to E12

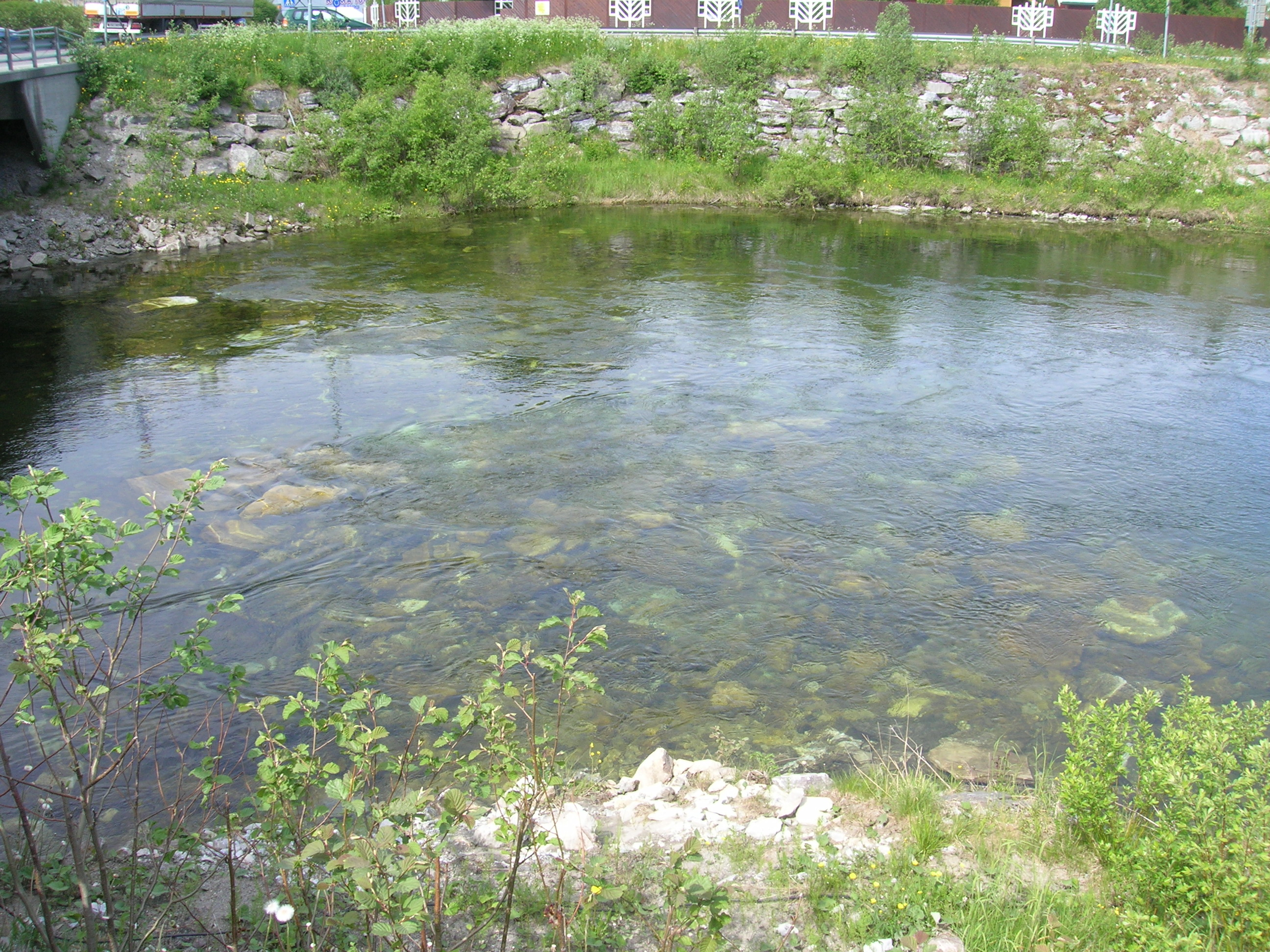
Revelelva seen from the bridge to E12

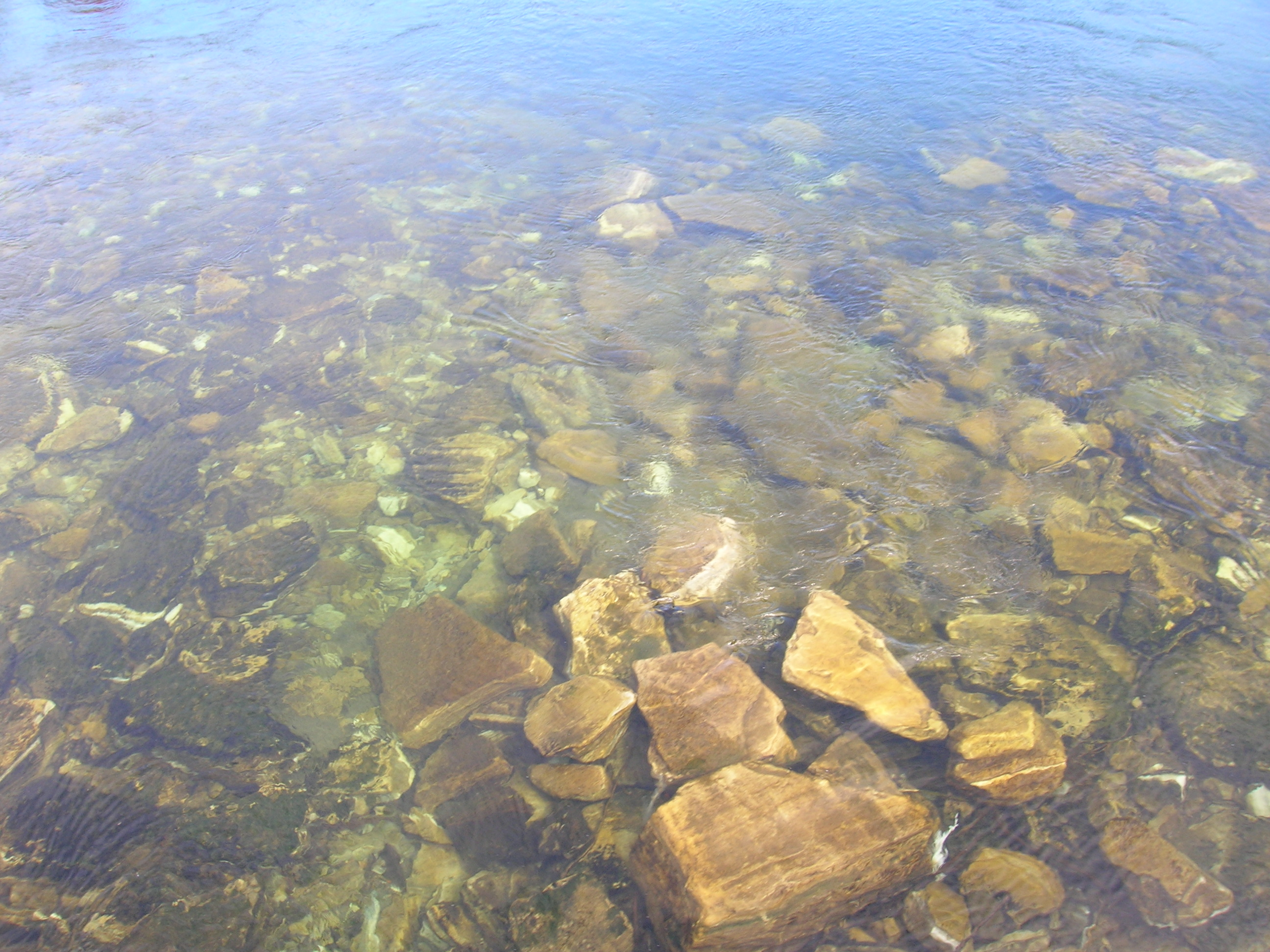
Revelelva seen from the bridge to E12

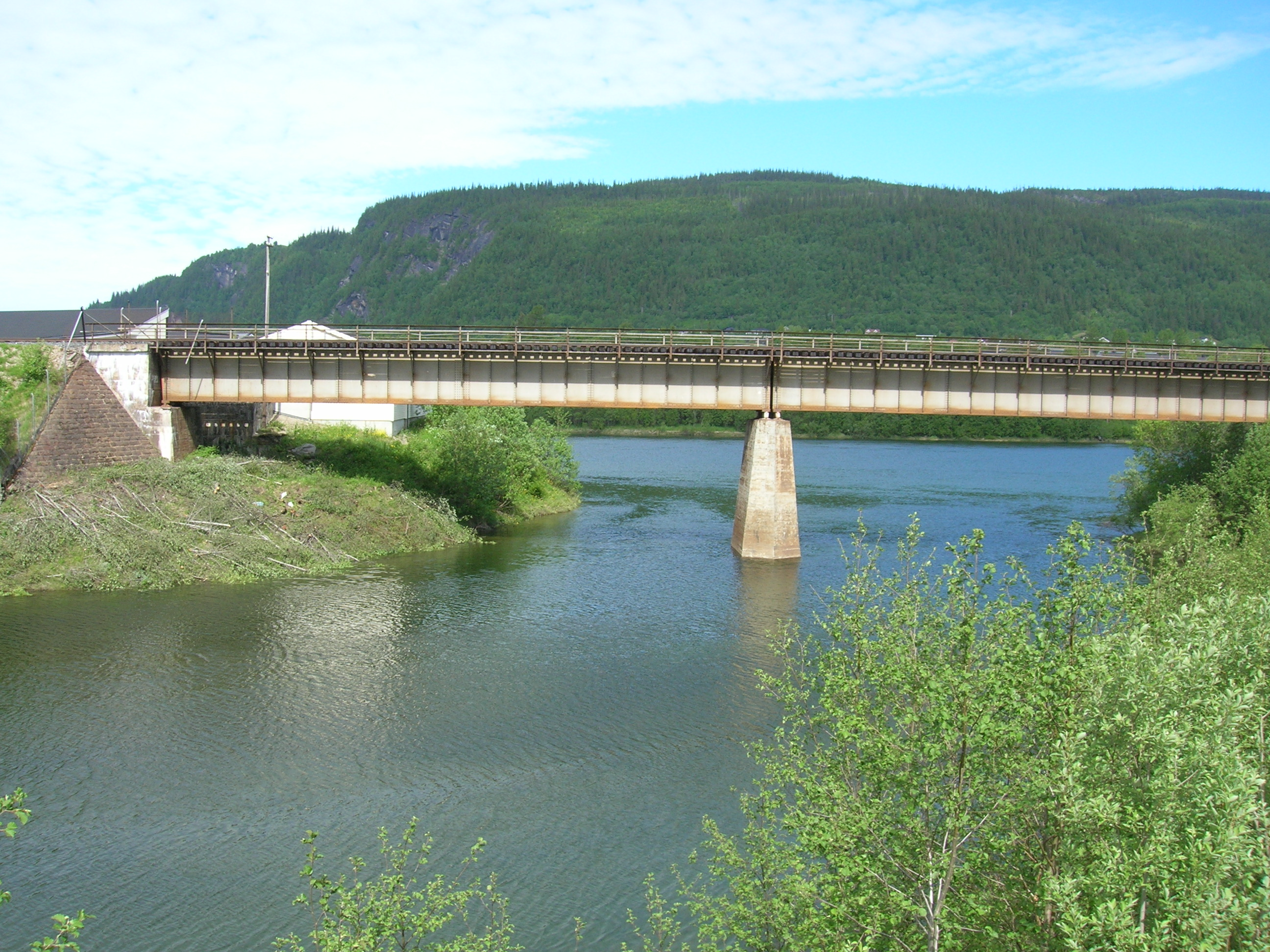
Outlet of Revelelva in Ranelva with the railway above

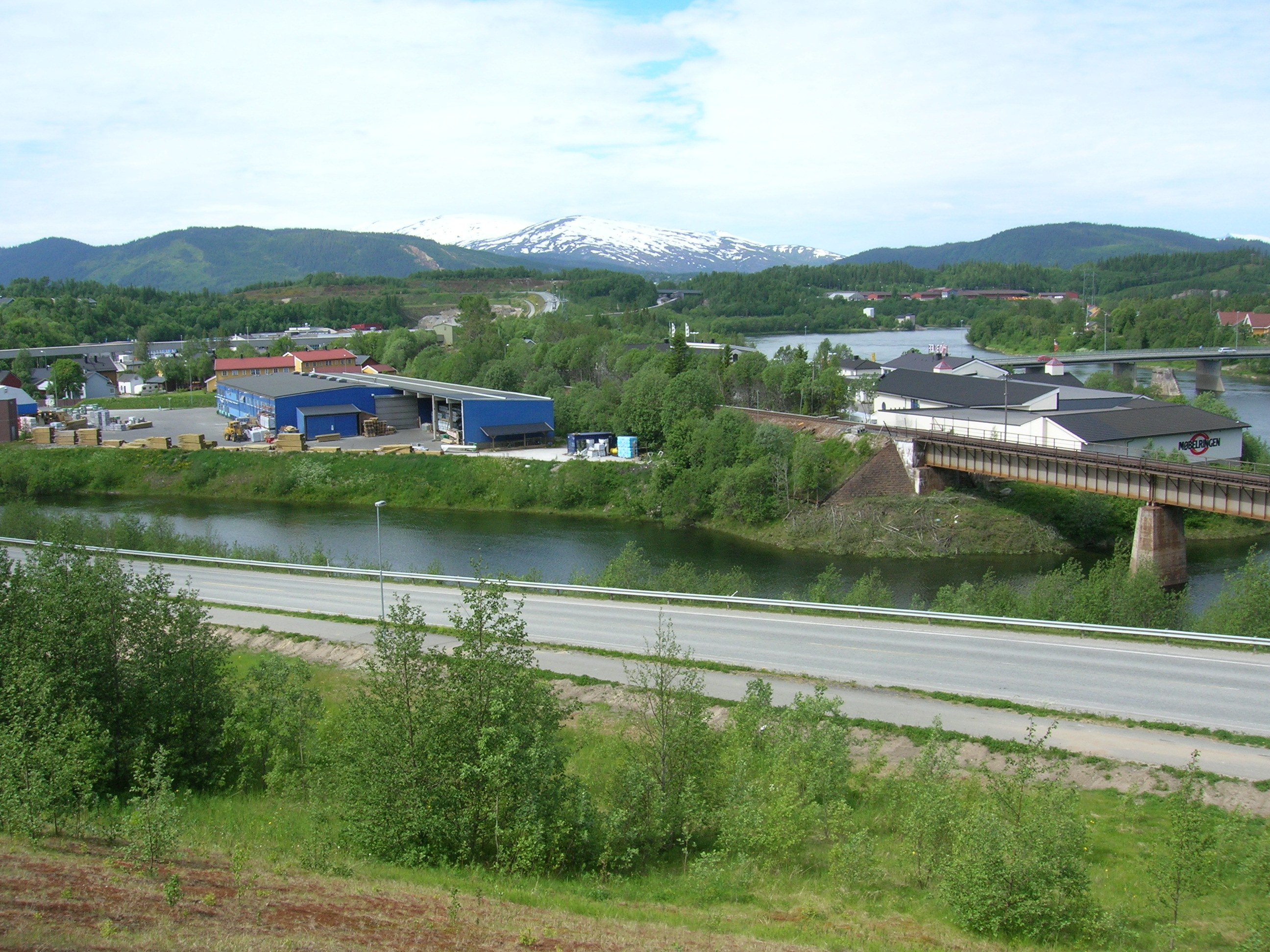
Outlet of Revelelva in Ranelva with the railway above

== See also ==
- List of rivers in Norway
