= Gruben, Rana =

Village in Rana Municipality, Norway

Gruben
- Neighborhood in Mo i Rana
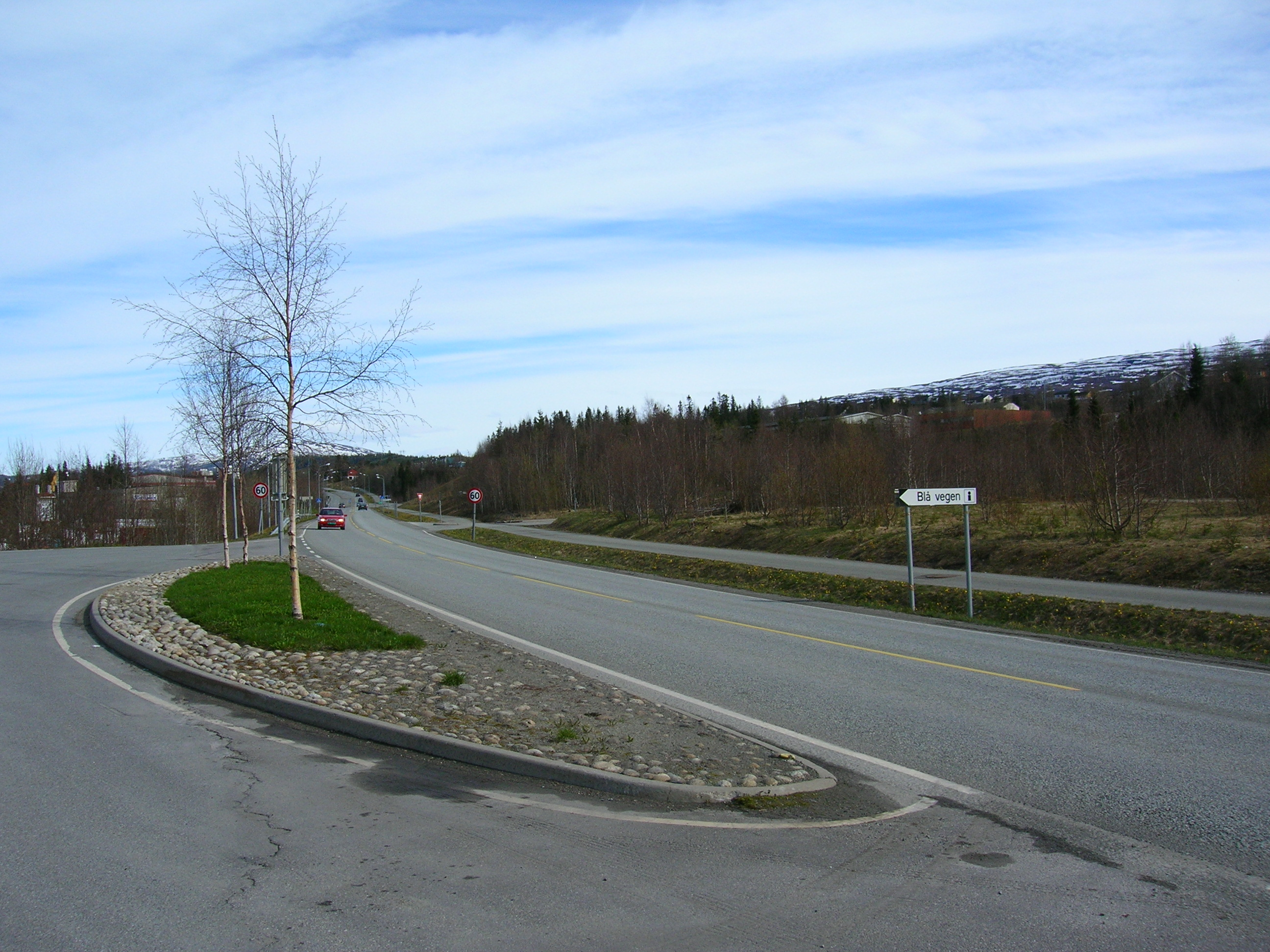
- View of E12 highway passing north of Gruben
- Interactive map of Gruben
- Location within Nordland Location within Norway
- Coordinates: 66.3175°N 14.2228°E
- Country: Norway
- Region: Northern Norway
- County: Nordland
- District: Helgeland
- Municipality: Rana Municipality
- Elevation: 58 m (190 ft)
- Time zone: UTC+01:00 (CET)
  - Summer (DST): UTC+02:00 (CEST)
- Post Code: 8610 Mo i Rana

Gruben is a neighborhood in the town of Mo i Rana in Rana Municipality in Nordland county, Norway. Gruben sits on the southern shore of the river Ranelva in the southeastern part of the town of Mo i Rana. European route E12 originally passed through of the village, but since 1995 it has passed north of the village.

Gruben has four daycare centres, a school with secondary classes, two grocery stores, one nursing home, two petrol stations, and a lot of local businesses. Gruben Church is a parish church that was built in 1965 with about 550 seats.
